= List of invasive species in Texas =

Numerous non-native plants have been introduced to Texas in the United States and many of them have become invasive species. The following is a list of some non-native invasive species established in Texas.

== Aquatic plants ==
- A
- B
- C
- D
- E
- F
- G
- H
- I
- J
- K
- L
- M
- N
- O
- P
- Q
- R
- S
- T
- U
- V
- W
- X
- Y
- Z

Invasive aquatic plants in Texas
Picture	Scientific name	Common name	Family
	Alternanthera philoxeroides	alligatorweed	Asteraceae (aster family)
	Alternanthera sessilis	sessile joyweed	Simaroubaceae (quassia-wood family)
	Arundo donax	giant reed	Fabaceae (pea family)
	Colocasia esculenta	elephant ears	Fabaceae (pea family)
	Egeria densa	Brazilian waterweed	Hydrocharitaceae (pickerelweed family)
	Eichhornia azurea	anchored water hyacinth	Brassicaceae (mustard family)
	Eichhornia crassipes	common water hyacinth	Liliaceae (lily family)
	Hydrilla verticillata	hydrilla	Poaceae (grass family)
	Ipomoea aquatica	swamp morning-glory	Polygonaceae (knotweed family)
	Lagarosiphon major	oxygen-weed	Liliaceae (lily family)
	Landoltia punctata	dotted duckmeat	Poaceae (grass family)
	Limnophila sessiliflora	limnophila	Poaceae (grass family)
	Lythrum salicaria	purple loosestrife	Poaceae (grass family)
	Myriophyllum aquaticum	parrotfeather milfoil	Poaceae (grass family)
	Myriophyllum spicatum	Eurasian watermilfoil	Moraceae (mulberry family)
	Nymphoides cristata	crested floating heart	Convolvulaceae (morning-glory family)
	Ottelia alismoides	duck-lettuce	Asteraceae (aster family)
	Panicum repens	couch panicum	Asteraceae (aster family)
	Phragmites australis	common reed	Poaceae (water-milfoil family)
	Pistia stratiotes	water lettuce	Asteraceae (aster family)
	Potamogeton crispus	curly pondweed	Potamogetonaceae (pondweed family)
	Salvinia minima	common salvinia	Casuarinaceae (sheoak family)
	Salvinia molesta	giant salvinia	Vitaceae (grape family)
	Sesbania punicea	rattlebox	Asteraceae (aster family)
	Solanum tampicense	aquatic soda apple	Asteraceae (aster family)

== Terrestrial plants ==
- A
- B
- C
- D
- E
- F
- G
- H
- I
- J
- K
- L
- M
- N
- O
- P
- Q
- R
- S
- T
- U
- V
- W
- X
- Y
- Z

Invasive terrestrial plants in Texas
Picture	Scientific name	Common name	Family
	Ailanthus altissima	tree of heaven	Simaroubaceae (quassia-wood family)
	Albizia julibrissin	mimosa	Fabaceae (pea family)
	Alhagi maurorum	camelthorn	Fabaceae (pea family)
	Alliaria petiolata	garlic mustard	Brassicaceae (mustard family)
	Allium vineale	wild garlic	Liliaceae (lily family)
	Amelichloa clandestina	Mexican needlegrass	Poaceae (grass family)
	Antigonon leptopus	coral vine	Polygonaceae (knotweed family)
	Asphodelus fistulosus	onionweed	Liliaceae (lily family)
	Asphodelus tenuifolius	onionweed	Liliaceae (lily family)
	Bothriochloa ischaemum var. songarica	King Ranch bluestem	Poaceae (grass family)
	Brassica tournefortii	Sahara mustard	Brassicaceae (mustard family)
	Bromus arvensis	field brome	Poaceae (grass family)
	Bromus catharticus	rescuegrass	Poaceae (grass family)
	Bromus tectorum	cheat grass	Poaceae (grass family)
	Broussonetia papyrifera	paper mulberry	Moraceae (mulberry family)
	Calystegia sepium	hedge false bindweed	Convolvulaceae (morning-glory family)
	Carduus nutans	nodding plumeless thistle	Asteraceae (aster family)
	Carduus tenuiflorus	slender-flowered thistle	Asteraceae (aster family)
	Carthamus lanatus	woolly distaff thistle	Asteraceae (aster family)
	Casuarina equisetifolia	beach sheoak	Casuarinaceae (sheoak family)
	Cayratia japonica	bushkiller	Vitaceae (grape family)
	Cenchrus ciliaris	buffelgrass	Poaceae (water-milfoil family)
	Centaurea melitensis	Malta star-thistle	Asteraceae (aster family)
	Centaurea solstitialis	yellow star-thistle	Asteraceae (aster family)
	Centaurea stoebe ssp. micranthos	spotted knapweed	Asteraceae (aster family)
	Cinnamomum camphora	camphor tree	Lauraceae (laurel family)
	Cirsium arvense	Canada thistle	Asteraceae (aster family)
	Cirsium vulgare	bull thistle	Asteraceae (aster family)
	Clerodendrum bungei	rose glorybower	Verbenaceae (verbena family)
	Commelina benghalensis	tropical spiderwort	Commelinaceae (spiderwort family)
	Conium maculatum	poison hemlock	Apiaceae (carrot family)
	Convolvulus arvensis	field bindweed	Convolvulaceae (morning-glory family)
	Coronilla varia	purple crown-vetch	Fabaceae (pea family)
	Cortaderia selloana	pampas grass	Poaceae (grass family)
	Cryptostegia grandiflora	palay rubbervine	Asclepiadaceae (milkweed family)
	Cupaniopsis anacardioides	carrotwood tree	Sapindaceae (soapberry family)
	Cuscuta japonica	Japanese dodder	Cuscutaceae (dodder family)
	Cyanthillium cinereum	little ironweed	Asteraceae (aster family)
	Cynodon dactylon	bermudagrass	Poaceae (grass family)
	Cynoglossum creticum	blue hound's tongue	Boraginaceae (forget-me-not family)
	Cynoglossum officinale	houndstongue	Boraginaceae (forget-me-not family)
	Cyperus entrerianus	deep-rooted sedge	Cyperaceae (sedge family)
	Cyperus rotundus	nutgrass	Cyperaceae (sedge family)
	Cyrtomium falcatum	Japanese netvein hollyfern	Dryopteridaceae (wood fern family)
	Dichanthium annulatum	Kleberg bluestem	Poaceae (grass family)
	Dichanthium aristatum	Angleton bluestem	Poaceae (grass family)
	Dichanthium sericeum	silky bluestem	Poaceae (grass family)
	Dioscorea bulbifera	air potato	Dioscoreaceae (yam family)
	Dioscorea oppositifolia	Chinese yam	Dioscoreaceae (yam family)
	Dipsacus fullonum	common teasel	Rhamnaceae (buckthorn family)
	Dolichandra unguis-cati	catclawvine	Bignoniaceae (trumpet-creeper family)
	Echium vulgare	blueweed	Boraginaceae (forget-me-not family)
	Elaeagnus angustifolia	Russian olive	Elaeagnaceae (oleaster family)
	Elaeagnus pungens	thorny olive	Elaeagnaceae (oleaster family)
	Elaeagnus umbellata	autumn olive	Elaeagnaceae (oleaster family)
	Elymus repens	quackgrass	Poaceae (water-milfoil family)
	Eragrostis lehmanniana	Lehman's love grass	Poaceae (grass family)
	Euonymus fortunei	winter creeper	Celastraceae (bitterweet family)
	Euphorbia esula	leafy spurge	Euphorbiaceae (spurge family)
	Ficus religiosa	peepul tree	Moraceae (mulberry family)
	Firmiana simplex	Chinese parasoltree	Sterculiaceae (cocoa family)
	Gibasis pellucida	dotted bridalveil	Commelinaceae (spiderwort family)
	Glandularia pulchella	South American mock vervain	Verbenaceae (verbena family)
	Hedera helix	English ivy	Araliaceae (ginseng family)
	Heracleum mantegazzianum	giant hogweed	Apiaceae (carrot family)
	Hovenia dulcis	Japanese raisintree	Rhamnaceae (buckthorn family)
	Ilex aquifolium	English holly	Aquifoliaceae (holly family)
	Imperata cylindrica	cogongrass	Poaceae (grass family)
	Iris pseudacorus	yellow flag iris	Iridaceae (iris family)
	Kalanchoe daigremontiana	mother of thousands	Crassulaceae (stonecrop family)
	Kickxia elatine	sharpleaf cancerwort	Scrophulariaceae (figwort family)
	Koelreuteria paniculata	golden rain tree	Sapindaceae (soapberry family)
	Lantana camara	largeleaf lantana	Verbenaceae (verbena family)
	Lepidium draba	whitetop	Brassicaceae (mustard family)
	Lepidium latifolium	perennial pepperweed	Brassicaceae (mustard family)
	Lespedeza bicolor	shrubby lespedeza	Fabaceae (pea family)
	Lespedeza cuneata	Chinese lespedeza	Fabaceae (pea family)
	Leucaena leucocephala	popinac	Fabaceae (pea family)
	Leucanthemum vulgare	oxeye daisy	Asteraceae (aster family)
	Ligustrum japonicum	Japanese privet	Oleaceae (olive family)
	Ligustrum lucidum	glossy privet	Oleaceae (olive family)
	Ligustrum quihoui	quihoui privet	Oleaceae (olive family)
	Ligustrum sinense	Chinese privet	Oleaceae (olive family)
	Ligustrum vulgare	European privet	Oleaceae (olive family)
	Linaria dalmatica	Dalmatian toadflax	Plantaginaceae (plantain family)
	Linaria vulgaris	yellow toadflax	Plantaginaceae (plantain family)
	Lolium arundinaceum	tall fescue	Poaceae (grass family)
	Lolium perenne	perennial ryegrass	Poaceae (grass family)
	Lonicera fragrantissima	winter bush honeysuckle	Caprifoliaceae (honeysuckle family)
	Lonicera japonica	Japanese honeysuckle	Caprifoliaceae (honeysuckle family)
	Lonicera maackii	Amur honeysuckle	Caprifoliaceae (honeysuckle family)
	Lonicera morrowii	Morrow's honeysuckle	Caprifoliaceae (honeysuckle family)
	Lonicera tatarica	bush honeysuckle	Caprifoliaceae (honeysuckle family)
	Lygodium japonicum	Japanese climbing fern	Lygodiaceae (climbing family)
	Marrubium vulgare	horehound	Lamiaceae (mint family)
	Medicago minima	little bur-clover	Fabaceae (pea family)
	Melaleuca quinquenervia	melaleuca	Myrtaceae (myrtle family)
	Melia azedarach	chinaberry tree	Meliaceae (mahogany family)
	Melilotus officinalis	yellow sweet clover	Fabaceae (pea family)
	Microstegium vimineum	Japanese stiltgrass	Poaceae (grass family)
	Miscanthus sinensis	Chinese silvergrass	Poaceae (grass family)
	Morus alba	white mulberry	Moraceae (mulberry family)
	Myagrum perfoliatum	bird's eye-cress	Brassicaceae (mustard family)
	Nandina domestica	heavenly bamboo	Berberidaceae (barberry family)
	Nassella trichotoma	serrated tussock grass	Poaceae (grass family)
	Nicotiana glauca	tree tobacco	Solanaceae (potato family)
	Nymphoides peltata	yellow floating heart	Menyanthaceae (marshwort family)
	Onopordum acanthium	Scotch thistle	Asteraceae (aster family)
	Orobanche ramosa	hemp broomrape	Orobanchaceae (broom-rape family)
	Paederia foetida	skunkvine	Rubiaceae (coffee family)
	Paliurus spina-christi	Jerusalem thorn	Rhamnaceae (buckthorn family)
	Paspalum dilatatum	dallisgrass	Poaceae (grass family)
	Paspalum notatum	bahiagrass	Poaceae (grass family)
	Paspalum urvillei	vasey grass	Poaceae (grass family)
	Paulownia tomentosa	princess tree	Scrophulariaceae (figwort family)
	Peganum harmala	African rue	Zygophyllaceae (creosote-bush family)
	Pennisetum ciliare	buffelgrass	Poaceae (grass family)
	Perilla frutescens	beefsteakplant	Lamiaceae (mint family)
	Photinia serratifolia	Taiwanese photinia	Rosaceae (rose family)
	Photinia × fraseri	redtip photinia	Rosaceae (rose family)
	Phyllostachys aurea	golden bamboo	Poaceae (grass family)
	Pistacia chinensis	Chinese pistache	Anacardiaceae (sumac family)
	Poncirus trifoliata	trifoliate orange	Rutaceae (citrus family)
	Populus alba	Alamo blanco	Salicaceae (willow family)
	Pueraria montana var. lobata	kudzu	Fabaceae (pea family)
	Pyracantha coccinea	scarlet firethorn	Rosaceae (rose family)
	Pyrus calleryana	callery pear	Rosaceae (rose family)
	Ranunculus ficaria	fig buttercup	Ranunculaceae (crowfoot family)
	Rapistrum rugosum	bastard cabbage	Brassicaceae (mustard family)
	Rhamnus cathartica	common buckthorn	Rhamnaceae (buckthorn family)
	Rhaponticum repens	Russian knapweed	Asteraceae (aster family)
	Ricinus communis	castor bean	Euphorbiaceae (spurge family)
	Rosa bracteata	Macartney rose	Rosaceae (rose family)
	Rosa laevigata	Cherokee rose	Rosaceae (rose family)
	Rosa multiflora	multiflora rose	Rosaceae (rose family)
	Rottboellia cochinchinensis	itchgrass	Poaceae (grass family)
	Ruellia caerulea	Britton's wild petunia	Acanthaceae (acanthus family)
	Salsola tragus	Russian thistle	Chenopodiaceae (goosefoot family)
	Scabiosa atropurpurea	pincushions	Dipsacaceae (teasel family)
	Schinus terebinthifolius	Brazilian peppertree	Anacardiaceae (sumac family)
	Senna pendula	climbing cassia, valamuerto	Fabaceae (pea family)
	Silybum marianum	blessed milk thistle	Asteraceae (aster family)
	Solanum pseudocapsicum	Jerusalem-cherry	Solanaceae (potato family)
	Solanum viarum	tropical soda apple	Solanaceae (potato family)
	Sorghum halepense	Johnson grass	Poaceae (grass family)
	Stellaria media	common chickweed	Caryophyllaceae (pink family)
	Tamarix africana	African tamarisk	Tamaricaceae (tamarisk family)
	Tamarix aphylla	Athel tamarisk	Tamaricaceae (tamarisk family)
	Tamarix chinensis	fivestamen tamarisk	Tamaricaceae (tamarisk family)
	Tamarix gallica	French tamarisk	Tamaricaceae (tamarisk family)
	Tamarix parviflora	smallflower tamarisk	Tamaricaceae (tamarisk family)
	Tamarix ramosissima	salt cedar	Tamaricaceae (tamarisk family)
	Taraxacum officinale	common dandelion	Asteraceae (aster family)
	Torilis arvensis	spreading hedgeparsley	Apiaceae (carrot family)
	Triadica sebifera	Chinese tallow tree	Euphorbiaceae (spurge family)
	Tribulus terrestris	puncturevine	Zygophyllaceae (creosote-bush family)
	Trifolium campestre	field clover	Fabaceae (pea family)
	Ulmus pumila	Siberian elm	Ulmaceae (elm family)
	Urochloa maxima	guineagrass	Poaceae (grass family)
	Verbascum thapsus	common mullein	Scrophulariaceae (figwort family)
	Verbena brasiliensis	Brazilian vervain	Verbenaceae (verbena family)
	Vernicia fordii	tungoil tree	Euphorbiaceae (spurge family)
	Vinca major	bigleaf periwinkle	Apocynaceae (dogbane family)
	Vinca minor	common periwinkle	Apocynaceae (dogbane family)
	Vitex agnus-castus	lilac chastetree	Verbenaceae (verbena family)
	Wisteria floribunda	Japanese wisteria	Fabaceae (pea family)
	Wisteria sinensis	Chinese wisteria	Fabaceae (pea family)
	Xanthium spinosum	spiny cocklebur	Asteraceae (aster family)

== Aquatic animals ==
- A
- B
- C
- D
- E
- F
- G
- H
- I
- J
- K
- L
- M
- N
- O
- P
- Q
- R
- S
- T
- U
- V
- W
- X
- Y
- Z

Invasive aquatic animals in Texas
Picture	Scientific name	Common name	Class	Order	Family	Type
	Anguilla anguilla	European eel	Actinopterygii	Anguilliformes	Anguillidae	Fish
	Carassius auratus	wild goldfish	Actinopterygii	Cypriniformes	Cyprinidae	Fish
	Channa argus	northern snakehead	Actinopterygii	Perciformes	Channidae	Fish
	Corbicula fluminea	Asian clam	Bivalvia	Veneroida	Corbiculidae	Mollusc
	Ctenopharyngodon idella	grass carp	Actinopterygii	Cypriniformes	Cyprinidae	Fish
	Cyprinodon variegatus	sheapshead minnow	Actinopterygii	Cyprinodontiformes	Cyprinodontidae	Fish
	Cyprinus carpio	common carp	Actinopterygii	Cypriniformes	Cyprinidae	Fish
	Dreissena polymorpha	zebra mussel	Bivalvia	Veneroida	Dreissenidae	Mollusc
	Gambusia geiseri	largespring gambusia	Actinopterygii	Cyprinodontiformes	Poeciliidae	Fish
	Hypophthalmichthys nobilis	bighead carp	Actinopterygii	Cypriniformes	Cyprinidae	Fish
	Hypostomus plecostomus	armored catfish	Actinopterygii	Osteichthyes	Loricariidae	Fish
	Lepomis auritus	redbreast sunfish	Actinopterygii	Perciformes	Centrarchidae	Fish
	Megabalanus coccopoma	titan acorn barnacle	Maxillopoda	Sessilia	Balanidae	Crustacean
	Micropterus dolomieu	smallmouth bass	Actinopterygii	Perciformes	Centrarchidae	Fish
	Mylopharyngodon piceus	black carp	Actinopterygii	Cypriniformes	Cyprinidae	Fish
	Myocastor coypus	nutria	Mammalia	Rodentia	Echimyidae	Mammal
	Oreochromis aureus	blue tilapia	Actinopterygii	Perciformes	Cichlidae	Fish
	Penaeus monodon	giant tiger prawn	Malacostraca	Decapoda	Penaeidae	Crustacean
	Perna perna	brown mussel	Bivalvia	Mytiloida	Mytilidae	Mollusc
	Perna viridis	Asian green mussel	Bivalvia	Mytiloida	Mytilidae	Mollusc
	Phyllorhiza punctata	Australian spotted jellyfish	Scyphozoa	Rhizostomeae	Mastigiidae	Jellyfish
	Pterois volitans	lionfish	Actinopterygii	Scorpaeniformes	Scorpaenidae	Fish
	Pterygoplichthys anisitsi	armored catfish	Actinopterygii	Osteichthyes	Loricariidae	Fish
	Salmo trutta	brown trout	Actinopterygii	Salmoniformes	Salmonidae	Fish
	Teredo navalis	naval shipworm	Bivalvia	Myoida	Teredinidae	Mollusc
	Tilapia mariae	spotted tilapia	Actinopterygii	Perciformes	Cichlidae	Fish
	Xenopus laevis	African clawed frog	Amphibia	Anura	Pipidae	Amphibian

== Terrestrial animals ==
- A
- B
- C
- D
- E
- F
- G
- H
- I
- J
- K
- L
- M
- N
- O
- P
- Q
- R
- S
- T
- U
- V
- W
- X
- Y
- Z

Invasive terrestrial animals in Texas
Picture	Scientific name	Common name	Class	Order	Family	Type
	Ammotragus lervia	Barbary sheep	Mammalia	Artiodactyla	Bovidae	Mammal
	Anolis sagrei	brown anole	Reptilia	Squamata	Dactyloidae	Reptile
	Axis axis	Axis deer	Mammalia	Artiodactyla	Cervidae	Mammal
	Belocaulus angustipes	black velvet leatherleaf slug	Gastropoda	Systellommatophora	Veronicellidae	Mollusc
	Bipalium kewense	hammerhead flatworm	Turbellaria	Tricladida	Geoplanidae	Flatworm
	Boiga irregularis	brown tree snake	Reptilia	Squamata	Colubridae	Reptile
	Bradybaena similaris	Asian trampsnail	Gastropoda	Stylommatophora	Bradybaenidae	Mollusc
	Bubulcus ibis	cattle egret	Aves	Ciconiiformes	Ardeidae	Bird
	Cepaea hortensis	white-lipped grove snail	Gastropoda		Helicidae	Mollusc
	Cervus nippon	Sika deer	Mammalia	Artiodactyla	Cervidae	Mammal
	Cipangopaludina chinensis	Chinese mystery snail	Gastropoda		Viviparidae	Mollusc
	Columba livia	rock pigeon	Aves	Columbiformes	Columbidae	Bird
	Cornu aspersum	brown garden snail	Gastropoda	Stylommatophora	Helicidae	Mollusc
	Deroceras laeve	marsh slug	Gastropoda	Stylommatophora	Agriolimacidae	Mollusc
	Eobania vermiculata	chocolate band snail	Gastropoda	Stylommatophora	Helicidae	Mollusc
	Euglandina rosea	rosy wolfsnail	Gastropoda	Stylommatophora	Spiraxidae	Mollusc
	Hemidactylus frenatus	common house gecko	Reptilia	Squamata	Gekkonidae	Reptile
	Hemidactylus turcicus	Mediterranean house gecko	Reptilia	Squamata	Gekkonidae	Reptile
	Iguana iguana	green iguana	Reptilia	Squamata	Iguanidae	Reptile
	Limax flavus	yellow garden slug	Gastropoda	Stylommatophora	Limacidae	Mollusc
	Limax maximus	giant garden slug	Gastropoda	Stylommatophora	Limacidae	Mollusc
	Lissachatina fulica	giant African snail	Gastropoda	Stylommatophora	Achatinidae	Mollusc
	Marisa cornuarietis	giant ramshorn snail	Gastropoda	Architaenioglossa	Ampullariidae	Mollusc
	Melanoides tuberculata	red-rimmed melania	Gastropoda		Thiaridae	Mollusc
	Myiopsitta monachus	monk parrot	Aves	Psittaciformes	Psittacidae	Bird
	Oryctolagus cuniculus	European rabbit	Mammalia	Lagomorpha	Leporidae	Mammal
	Otala lactea	milk snail	Gastropoda	Stylommatophora	Helicidae	Mollusc
	Passer domesticus	common sparrow	Aves	Passeriformes	Passeridae	Bird
	Platydemus manokwari	New Guinea flatworm	Trepaxonemata	Neoophora	Geoplanidae	Flatworm
	Pomacea maculata	apple snail	Gastropoda	Architaenioglossa	Architaenioglossa	Mollusc
	Rattus norvegicus	Norway rat	Mammalia	Rodentia	Muridae	Mammal
	Rumina decollata	decollate snail	Gastropoda	Stylommatophora	Subulinidae	Mollusc
	Streptopelia decaocto	Eurasian collared dove	Aves	Columbiformes	Columbidae	Bird
	Sturnus vulgaris	European starling	Aves	Passeriformes	Sturnidae	Bird
	Sus scrofa	feral pig	Mammalia	Artiodactyla	Suidae	Mammal
	Tarebia granifera	quilted melania	Gastropoda	Neotaenioglossa	Thiaridae	Mollusc

== Insects ==
- A
- B
- C
- D
- E
- F
- G
- H
- I
- J
- K
- L
- M
- N
- O
- P
- Q
- R
- S
- T
- U
- V
- W
- X
- Y
- Z

Invasive insects in Texas
Picture	Scientific name	Common name	Class	Order	Family	Host
	Acarapis woodi	honeybee tracheal mite	Arachnida	Trombidiformes	Tarsonemidae	
	Aedes albopictus	Asian tiger mosquito	Insecta	Diptera	Culicidae	None
	Aethina tumida	small hive beetle	Insecta	Coleoptera	Nitidulidae	
	Agonoscelis puberula	African cluster bug	Insecta	Hemiptera	Pentatomidae	Thyme, flax, coffee tree, and the invasive weed, horehound
	Agrilus planipennis	emerald ash borer	Insecta	Coleoptera	Buprestidae	Ash trees (Fraxinus)
	Agrilus prionurus	soapberry borer	Insecta	Coleoptera	Buprestidae	Western soapberry (Sapindus saponaria var. drummondii)
	Anastrepha ludens	Mexican fruit fly	Insecta	Diptera	Tephritidae	
	Anoplophora glabripennis	Asian longhorned beetle	Insecta	Coleoptera	Cerambycidae	Most hardwood trees
	Apis mellifera scutellata	Africanized honey bee	Insecta	Hymenoptera	Apidae	
	Athysanus argentarius	silver leafhopper	Insecta	Hemiptera	Cicadellidae	Tall grasses including lawns and hayfields
	Aulacaspis yasumatsui	cycad aulacaspis scale	Insecta	Hemiptera	Diaspididae	Sago palms
	Bagrada hilaris	bagrada bug	Insecta	Hemiptera	Pentatomidae	0
	Balclutha rubrostriata	red-streaked leafhopper	Insecta	Hemiptera	Cicadellidae	Grasses and sugar cane
	Bemisia tabaci	silverleaf whitefly	Insecta	Hemiptera	Aleyrodidae	
	Blatta lateralis	Turkestan cockroach	Insecta	Blattaria	Blattidae	None
	Brachymyrmex patagonicus	rover ant	Insecta	Hymenoptera	Formicidae	N/A
	Brevipalpus californicus	scarlet mite	Arachnida	Prostigmata	Tenuipalpidae	
	Cactoblastis cactorum	cactus moth	Insecta	Lepidoptera	Pyralidae	Prickly pear cacti of the genus Opuntia
	Callidiellum villosulum	brown fir longhorned beetle	Insecta	Coleoptera	Cerambycidae	Chinese fir, Cunninghamia lanceolata and Japanese cedar, Cryptomeria japonica
	Centuroides gracilis	Florida bark scorpion	Arachnida	Scorpiones	Buthidae	None
	Cimex lectularius	common bed bug	Insecta	Hemiptera	Cimicidae	The common bedbug doesn't utilize a host plant, it is known for seeking human hosts.
	Circulifer tenellus	beet leafhopper	Insecta	Hemiptera	Cicadellidae	Beets, tomato, chile plants
	Coptotermes formosanus	Formosan subterranean termite	Insecta	Isoptera	Rhinotermitidae	None
	Coridromius chenopoderis		Insecta	Hemiptera	Miridae	Coridromius chenopoderis has the widest range of host plants from the genus Coridromius. It hosts at least 17 plant species in the Chenopodiaceae (chenopods). Which are flowering plants such as spinach, beets, goosefoot, or mangel-wurzel.
	Diaphorina citri	Asian citrus psyllid	Insecta	Hemiptera	Psyllidae	
	Diaprepes abbreviatus	citrus root weevil	Insecta	Coleoptera	Curculionidae	Most common hosts are: citrus trees, papayas, sweet potatoes, ornamental plants, sugarcane, panicum grasses, peanut, corn, and other plant species. The citrus root weevil is known to feed on over 270 species of plants from 59 different families.
	Diestrammena asynamora	greenhouse camel cricket	Insecta	Orthoptera	Rhaphidophoridae	None
	Diuraphis noxia	Russian wheat aphid	Insecta	Hemiptera	Aphididae	Variety of natural grasses. Primarily wheat, barley, and rye.
	Drosophila suzukii	spotted-winged drosophila	Insecta	Diptera	Drosophilidae	Prunus spp. (mainly sweet cherries, but also on peaches and plums), Vaccinium spp. (blueberries), Rubus spp. (e.g., raspberries and blackberries), Fragaria ananassa (strawberries). Other recorded hosts include: Actinidia spp. (hardy kiwis), Cornus spp., Diospyros kaki (persimmons), Ficus carica (figs), Vitis vinifera (table and wine grapes). D. suzukii can be present in already damaged fruits, e.g., Malus domestica (apples) and Pyrus pyrifolia (Asian pears).
	Eupteryx melissae	sage leafhopper	Insecta	Hemiptera	Cicadellidae	Eupteryx melissae are found on many herb species and potted plants such as: lavender, mint, oregano, rosemary, thyme, sage, lemon balm, and Phlomis species.
	Forficula auricularia	European earwig	Insecta	Dermaptera	Forficulidae	Not specific
	Grapholita molesta	Oriental fruit moth	Insecta	Lepidoptera	Tortricidae	
	Halyomorpha halys	brown marmorated stink bug	Insecta	Hemiptera	Pentatomidae	Many agriculturally-important plants, from apples to soybeans. Also, various ornamental plants are at risk.
	Heteropoda venatoria	huntsman spider	Arachnida	Araneae	Sparassidae	
	Latrodectus geometricus	brown widow	Arachnida	Araneae	Theridiidae	None
	Linepithema humile	Argentine ant	Insecta	Hymenoptera	Formicidae	None
	Lycorma delicatula	spotted lanternfly	Insecta	Hemiptera	Fulgoridae	The spotted lanternfly feeds on over 70 known host plants, with 25 identified in Pennsylvania. These include economically important plants, particularly common grape vine (Vitis vinifera), but ranging from apples, other grapes, birch, cherry, lilac, maple, poplar, stone fruits, and the non-native invasive tree-of-heaven (Ailanthus altissima), which it appears to prefer. The spotted lanternfly is likely to establish itself where tree-of-heaven is present, as they co-occur in their native regions of Asia.
	Lymantria dispar	gypsy moth	Insecta	Lepidoptera	Lymantriidae	500 species of trees and shrubs
	Maconellicoccus hirsutus	pink hibiscus mealybug	Insecta	Hemiptera	Pseudococcidae	Infects its namesake, Hibiscus, but also citrus, coffee, sugar cane, plums, guava, mango, okra, sorrel, teak, mora, pigeon pea, peanut, grapevine, maize, asparagus, chrysanthemum, beans, cotton, soybean, cocoa, and many other plants.
	Mantis religiosa	European mantis	Insecta	Mantodea	Mantidae	None
	Mayetiola destructor	Hessian fly	Insecta	Diptera	Cecidomyiidae	Wheat (spring and winter) is the preferred host of the Hessian fly. Barley, oats, triticale and rye are generally considered resistant. Wild grasses such as quackgrass, western wheatgrass, rye grasses are also known hosts.
	Megacopta cribraria	bean plataspid	Insecta	Hemiptera	Plataspidae	Soy beans, kudzu, and other leguminous crops
	Melanaphis sacchari	sugarcane aphid	Insecta	Hemiptera	Aphididae	
	Monomorium pharaonis	pharaoh ant	Insecta	Hymenoptera	Formicidae	None
	Nylanderia fulva	tawny crazy ant	Insecta	Hymenoptera	Formicidae	None
	Oligotoma nigra	black webspinner	Insecta	Embiidina	Oligotomidae	Lichens and moss
	Panchlora nivea	green banana cockroach	Insecta	Blattodea	Blaberidae	Panchlora nivea is known to infest banana trees and is not considered an indoor pest.
	Paratrechina longicornis	black crazy ant	Insecta	Hymenoptera	Formicidae	
	Pectinophora gossypiella	pink bollwork	Insecta	Lepidoptera	Gelechiidae	
	Perkinsiella saccharicida	sugarcane planthopper	Insecta	Hemiptera	Delphacidae	
	Phaedon desotonis	coreopsis leaf beetle	Insecta	Coleoptera	Chrysomelidae	
	Phyllocnistis citrella	citrus leafminer	Insecta	Lepidoptera	Gracillariidae	
	Pieris rapae	small cabbage moth	Insecta	Lepidoptera	Pieridae	
	Piezodorus guildinii	red banded stink bug	Insecta	Hemiptera	Pentatomidae	
	Polistes dominula	European paper wasp	Insecta	Hymenoptera	Vespidae	None
	Rhipicephalus sanguineus	brown dog tick	Arachnida	Ixodida	Ixodidae	Rhipicephalus sanguineus parasitizes dogs and other available mammals depending on the region.
	Rhynchophorus palmarum	South American palm weevil	Insecta	Coleoptera	Dryophthoridae	
	Scapteriscus borellii	southern mole cricket	Insecta	Orthoptera	Gryllotalpidae	Not specific, omnivorous
	Scirtothrips dorsalis	chilli thrip	Insecta	Thysanoptera	Thripidae	Scirtothrips dorsalis is a polyphagous species with more than 100 recorded hosts from about 40 families.
	Scolytus schevyrewi	banded elm bark beetle	Insecta	Coleoptera	Curculionidae	
	Siphanta acuta	torpedo bug	Insecta	Neoptera	Fulgoroidea	Siphanta acuta is found on: banana, citrus, coffee, guava, macadamia, and many ornamental plants.
	Sirex noctilio	sirex woodwasp	Insecta	Hymenoptera	Siricidae	Monterey pine (Pinus radiata) and loblolly pine (P. taeda). Other known susceptible pines include slash (P. elliottii), shortleaf (P. echinata), ponderosa (P. ponderosa), lodgepole (P. contorta), and jack (P. banksiana).
	Sitona lineatus	pea leaf weevil	Insecta	Coleoptera	Curculionidae	Cultivated peas and other leguminous crops and grasses
	Solenopsis invicta	red imported fire ant	Insecta	Hymenoptera	Formicidae	None
	Sophonia orientalis	two-spotted leafhopper	Insecta	Hemiptera	Cicadellidae	
	Spartocera batatas	giant sweetpotato bug	Insecta	Hemiptera	Coreidae	Sweet potato, eggplant, tomato, potato, and avocado
	Tapinoma melanocephalum	ghost ant	Insecta	Hymenoptera	Formicidae	None
	Varroa destructor	varroa mite	Arachnida	Mesostigmata	Varroidae	
	Velarifictorus micado	Japanese burrowing cricket	Insecta	Orthoptera	Gryllidae	
	Xanthogaleruca luteola	elm leaf beetle	Insecta	Coleoptera	Chrysomelidae	
	Xyleborus glabratus	redbay ambrosia beetle	Insecta	Coleoptera	Curculionidae	In the southeastern United States, the reported hosts of the redbay ambrosia beetle/laurel wilt pathogen have included the red bay (Persea borbonia), silk bay (P. borbonia var. humbles), swamp bay (P. palustris), sassafras (Sassafras album), and avocado (P. americana). The laurel wilt pathogen has also been recovered in the southeastern United States from diseased plants of pond berry (Lindera melissifolia), camphor tree (Cinnamomum camphora), and pond spice (Litsea aestivates) trees.
	Xylosandrus crassiusculus	granulate ambrosia beetle	Insecta	Coleoptera	Curculionidae	
	Zaprionus indianus	African fig fly	Insecta	Diptera	Drosophilidae	

== Pathogens ==
- A
- B
- C
- D
- E
- F
- G
- H
- I
- J
- K
- L
- M
- N
- O
- P
- Q
- R
- S
- T
- U
- V
- W
- X
- Y
- Z

Invasive pathogens in Texas
Picture	Scientific name	Common name	Class	Order	Family	Type
	Anguillicola crassus	eel swimbladder nematode	Secernentea	Spirurida	Dracunculidae	Parasite
	Batrachochytrium dendrobatidis	chytrid frog fungus	Chytridiomycetes	Rhizophydiales		Fungi
	Bothriocephalus acheilognathi	Asian tapeworm	Cestoidea	Bothriocephalidea	Bothriocephalidae	Parasite
	Candidatus Liberibacter	huanglongbing		Hyphomicrobiales	Phyllobacteriaceae	Bacteria
	Ceratocystis fagacearum	oak wilt	Sordariomycetes	Microascales	Ceratocystidaceae	Fungi
	Closterovirus species	citrus tristeza virus (CTV)	Alsuviricetes	Martellivirales	Closteroviridae	Virus
	Ditylenchus dipsaci	alfalfa stem and root nematode	Chromadorea	Tylenchida	Anguinidae	Parasite
	Heterodera glycines	soybean cyst nematode	Chromadorea	Tylenchida	Heteroderidae	Parasite
	Novirhabdovirus species	viral hemorrhagic septicemia (VHS)	Monjiviricetes	Mononegavirales	Rhabdoviridae	Virus
	Ophiostoma ulmi	Dutch elm disease	Sordariomycetes	Ophiostomatales	Ophiostomataceae	Fungi
	Phakopsora pachyrhizi	soybean rust	Urediniomycetes	Uredinales	Phakopsoraceae	Fungi
	Phytophthora capsici	blight of peppers	Oomycetes	Peronosporales	Peronosporaceae	Fungi
	Pseudogymnoascus destructans	white nose syndrome	Dothideomycetes	Incertae sedis	Pseudeurotiaceae	Fungi
	Raffaelea lauricola	laurel wilt	Sordariomycetes	Ophiostomatales	Ophiostomataceae	Fungi
	Tilletia indica	karnal bunt	Exobasidiomycetes	Tilletiales	Tilletiaceae	Fungi

== See also ==
- Invasive species in the United States
- Animal and Plant Health Inspection Service
- North Texas Invasive Species Barrier Act of 2014
