= Neoophora =

Scientific classification
- Domain: Eukaryota
- Kingdom: Animalia
- Phylum: Platyhelminthes
- Subclass: Trepaxonemata
- Infraclass: Neoophora

Orders
- Lecithoepitheliata; Rhabdocoela; Proseriata; Prolecithophora; Fecampiida; Tricladida; Bothrioplanida; Neodermata

Group of flatworms

Neoophora is a group of rhabditophoran flatworms with ectolecithal eggs, i.e., yolk is not present in the egg as in most animals, but rather is secreted by accessory glands called vitellaria or yolk glands. These glands have the same embryonic origin as the ovaries, but usually constitute a separate organ in adult animals.

The monophyly of Neoophora is disputed, since some recent molecular studies indicated that the most basal order, Lecithoepitheliata, is more closely related to Polycladida, a non-neoophoran order, than to other neoophorans. This would imply that the ectolecithal condition would have evolved twice. The clade formed by all other neoophorans, excluding Lecithoepitheliata, is usually called Euneoophora.
