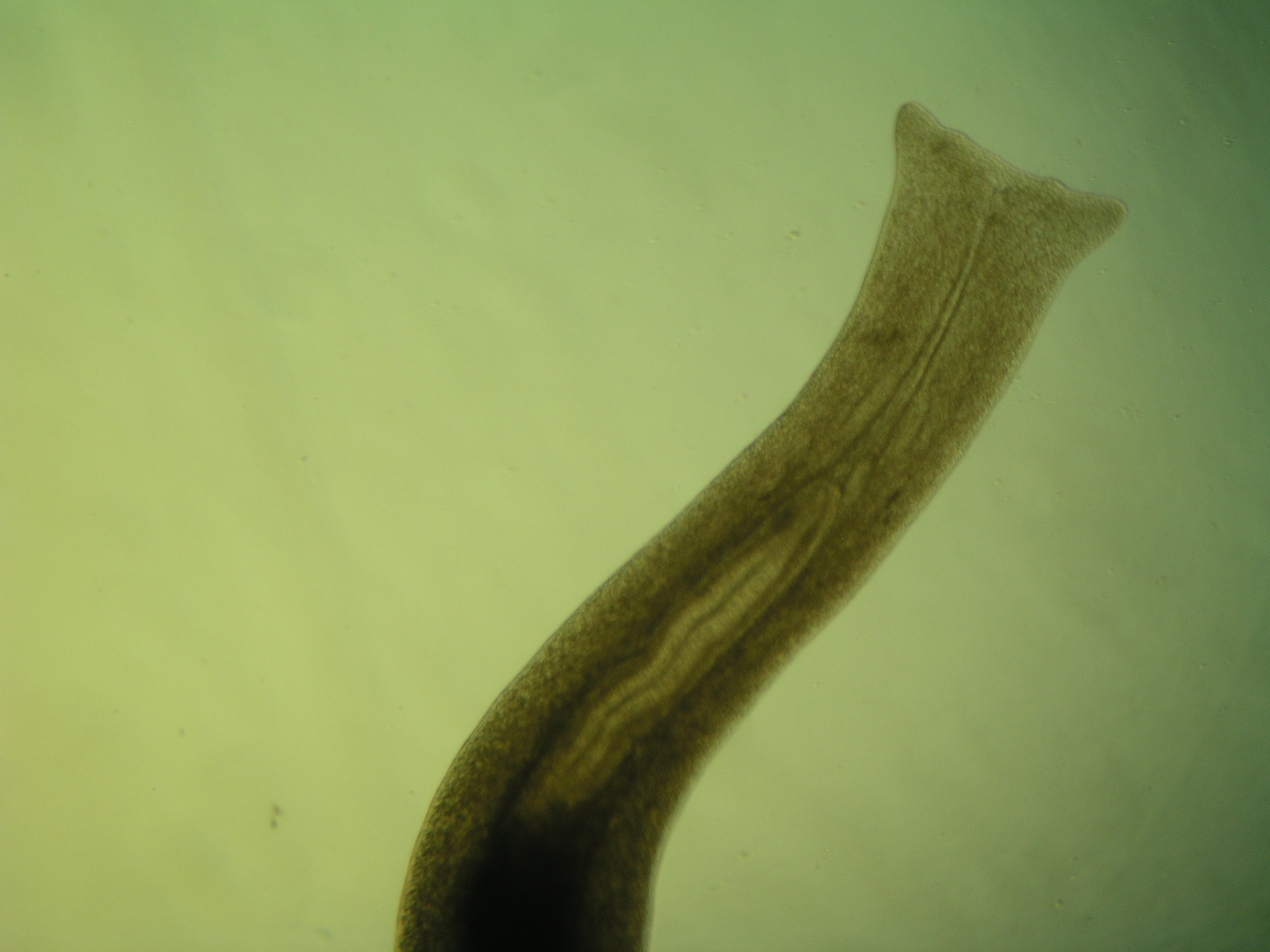
- Prorhynchus fontinalis

Scientific classification
- Kingdom: Animalia
- Phylum: Platyhelminthes
- Order: Prorhynchida
- Family: Prorhynchidae
- Genus: Prorhynchus; Schultze, 1851

= Prorhynchus =

Genus of flatworms

Prorhynchus is a genus of flatworms belonging to the family Prorhynchidae.

Species:

- Prorhynchus alpinus
- Prorhynchus fontinalis
- Prorhynchus hastatus
