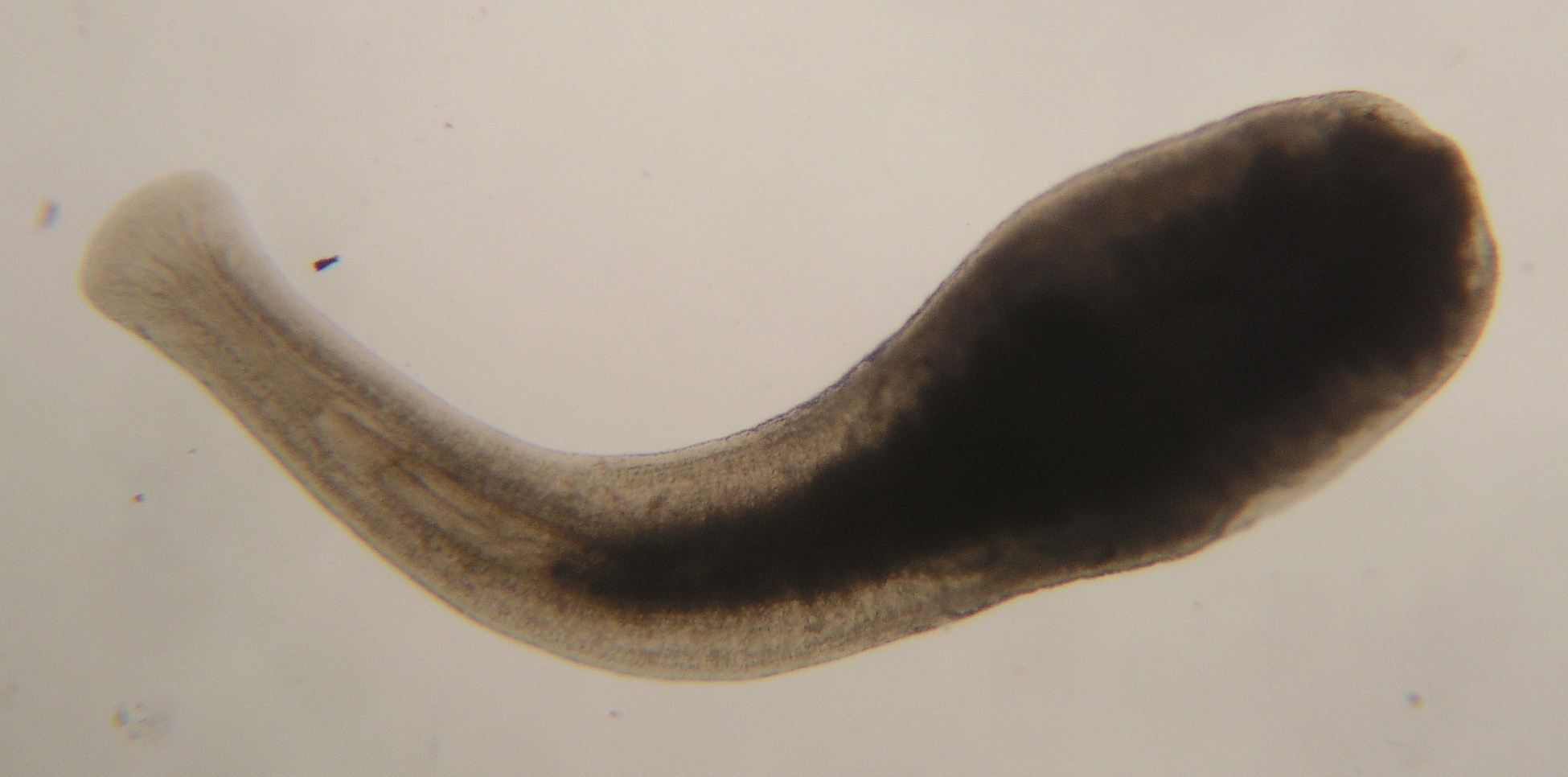
- Geocentrophora baltica
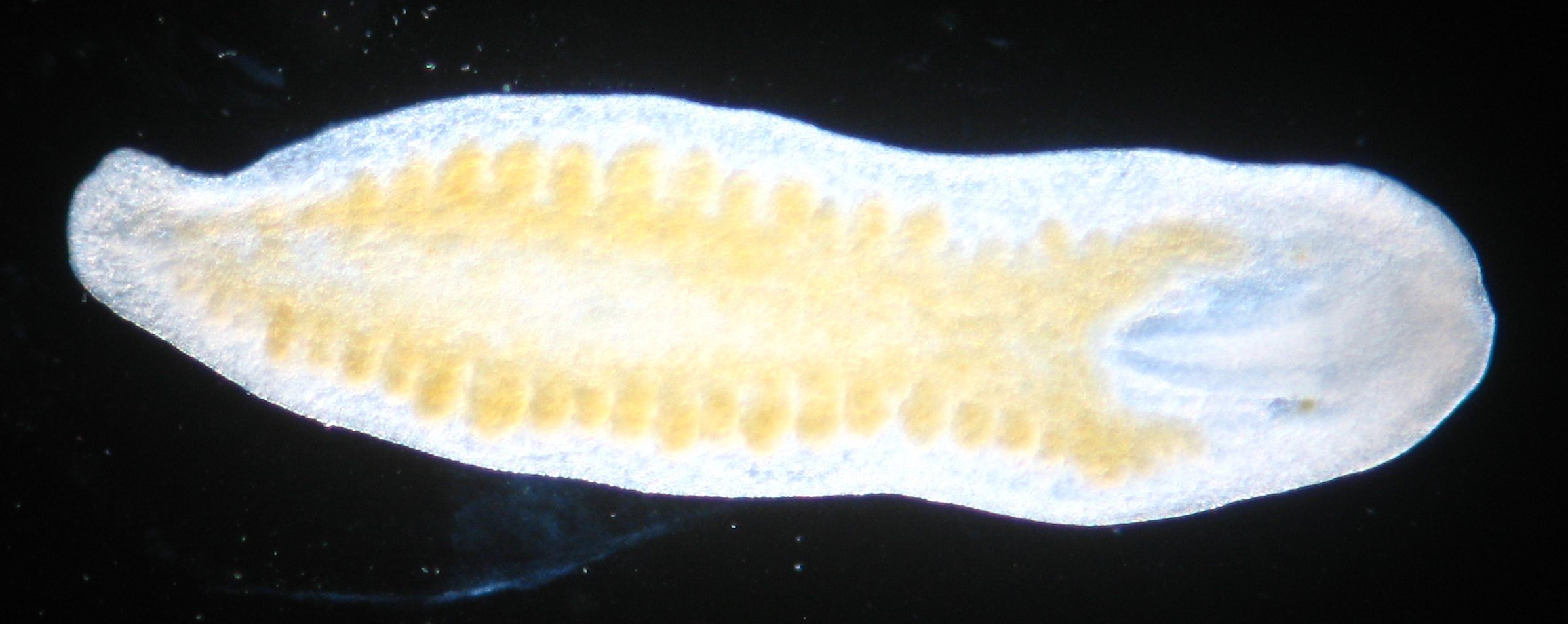
- Geocentrophora applanata

Scientific classification
- Kingdom: Animalia
- Phylum: Platyhelminthes
- Order: Prorhynchida
- Family: Prorhynchidae
- Genus: Geocentrophora de Man, 1876

Species
- See Taxonomy

= Geocentrophora =

Genus of flatworms

Geocentrophora is a genus of flatworms belonging to the family Prorhynchidae.

== Taxonomy ==
The following species are recognised in the genus Geocentrophora:

- G. applanata (Kennel, 1888)
- G. baltica (Kennel, 1883)
- G. boui de Beauchamp & Gourbault, 1967
- G. cavernicola Carpenter, 1970
- G. gigas Timoshkin, 1984
- G. incognita Timoshkin & Zabrovskaya, 1984
- G. intersticialis Timoshkin, 1984
- G. levanidorum Timoshkin, 1984
- G. marcusi Darlington, 1959
- G. metameroides (de Beauchamp, 1913)
- G. olgae Timoshkin, 1991
- G. papii Sauber, 1970
- G. porfirievae Timoshkin & Zabrovskaya, 1984
- G. sphyrocephala de Man, 1876
- G. tropica Hyman, 1941
- G. wagini Timoshkin, 1984
- G. wasiliewi Timoshkin, 1991
