= Bothrioneodermata =

Scientific classification
- Kingdom: Animalia
- Phylum: Platyhelminthes
- Clade: Acentrosomata
- Clade: Bothrioneodermata

Clade of flatworms

Bothrioneodermata is a clade of flatworms containing the Bothrioplanida and the Neodermata.
