= Panchlora hebardi =

Scientific classification
- Kingdom: Animalia
- Phylum: Arthropoda
- Clade: Pancrustacea
- Class: Insecta
- Order: Blattodea
- Family: Blaberidae
- Subfamily: Panchlorinae
- Genus: Panchlora
- Species: P. hebardi

Binomial name
- Panchlora hebardi Princis, 1951

Synonyms
- Panchlora nivea Hebard, 1926 (homonym)

Species of cockroaches

Panchlora hebardi is a species of cockroach named by K. Princis in 1951 and found in South America.
