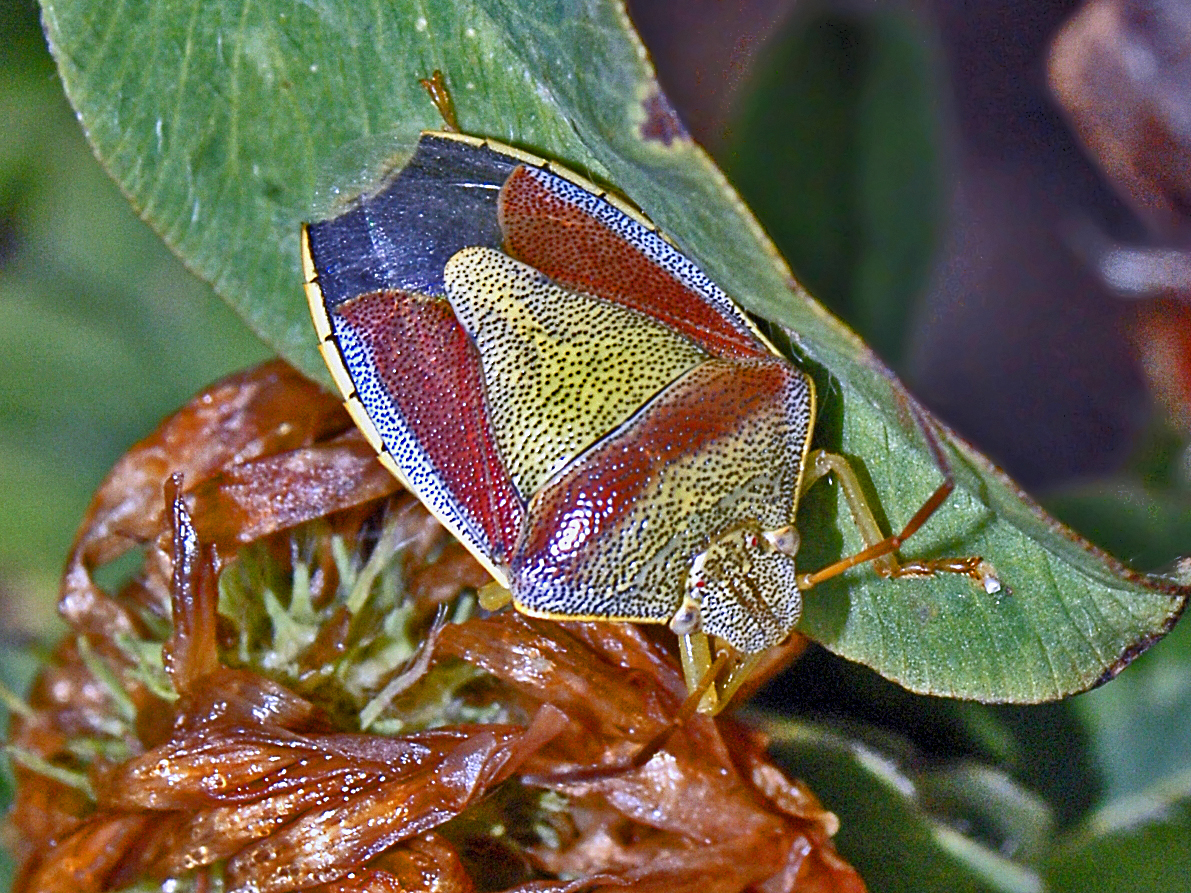
- Piezodorus lituratus

Scientific classification
- Domain: Eukaryota
- Kingdom: Animalia
- Phylum: Arthropoda
- Class: Insecta
- Order: Hemiptera
- Suborder: Heteroptera
- Family: Pentatomidae
- Subfamily: Pentatominae
- Tribe: Piezodorini
- Genus: Piezodorus; Fieber, 1860

= Piezodorus =

Genus of true bugs

Piezodorus is a genus of Pentatomidae, a family of shield bugs.

== Species ==
- Piezodorus guildinii Westwood
- Piezodorus lituratus (Fabricius, 1794) – gorse shield bug
- Piezodorus punctipes Puton, 1889
- Piezodorus rubrofasciatus (Fabricius, 1787)
- Piezodorus teretipes (Stål, 1865)
