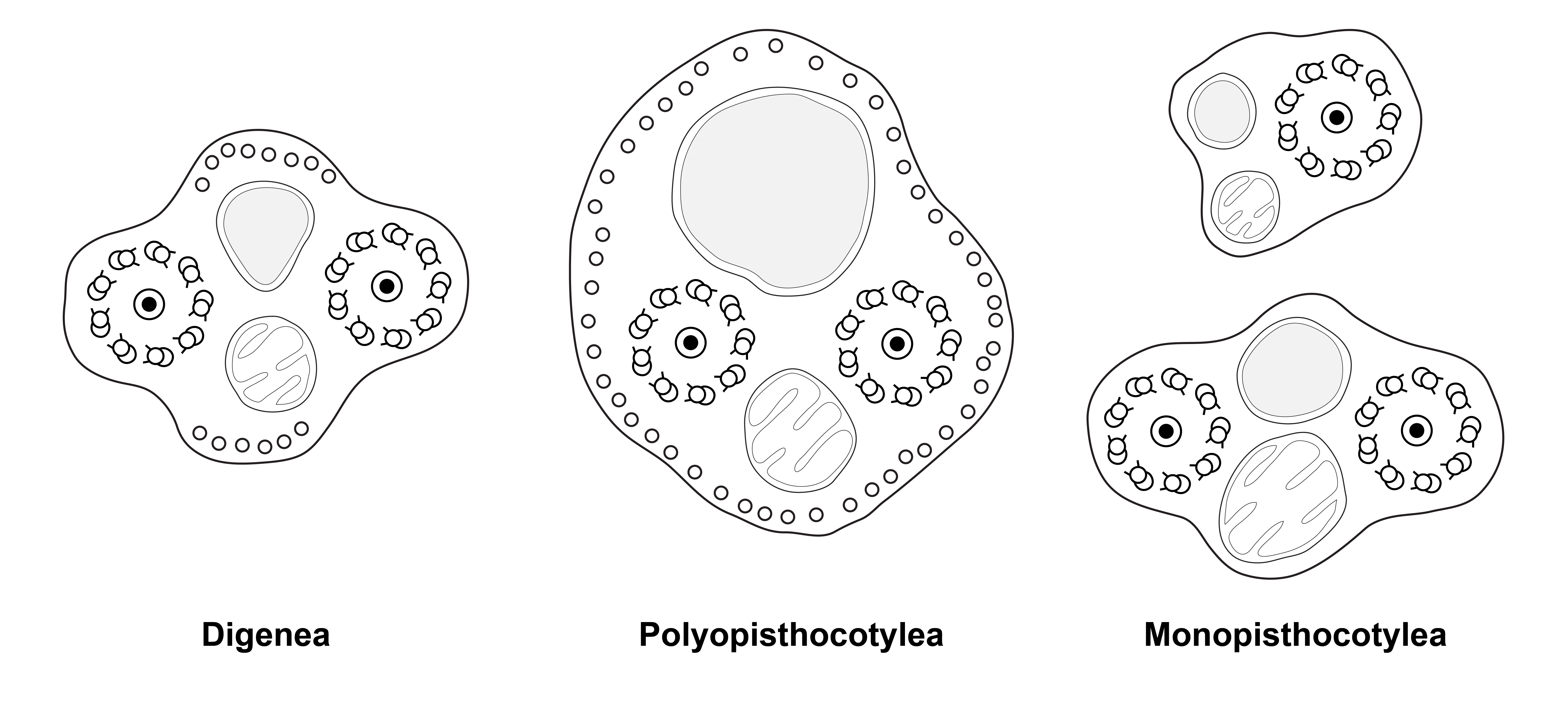
- Spermatozoa of various Trepaxonemata (transverse sections, transmission electron microscopy)

Scientific classification
- Kingdom: Animalia
- Phylum: Platyhelminthes
- Subphylum: Rhabditophora
- Clade: Trepaxonemata; Ehlers, 1985

Subgroups
- See text

= Trepaxonemata =

Subclass of flatworms

Trepaxonemata (from trepa-, spiral + axoneme) is a clade of flatworms. It includes all parasitic flatworms (clade Neodermata) and several free-living species that were previously grouped in the now obsolete class Turbellaria. Therefore, it contains the majority of species in the phylum Platyhelminthes, excluding Catenulida and Macrostomorpha.

== Description ==
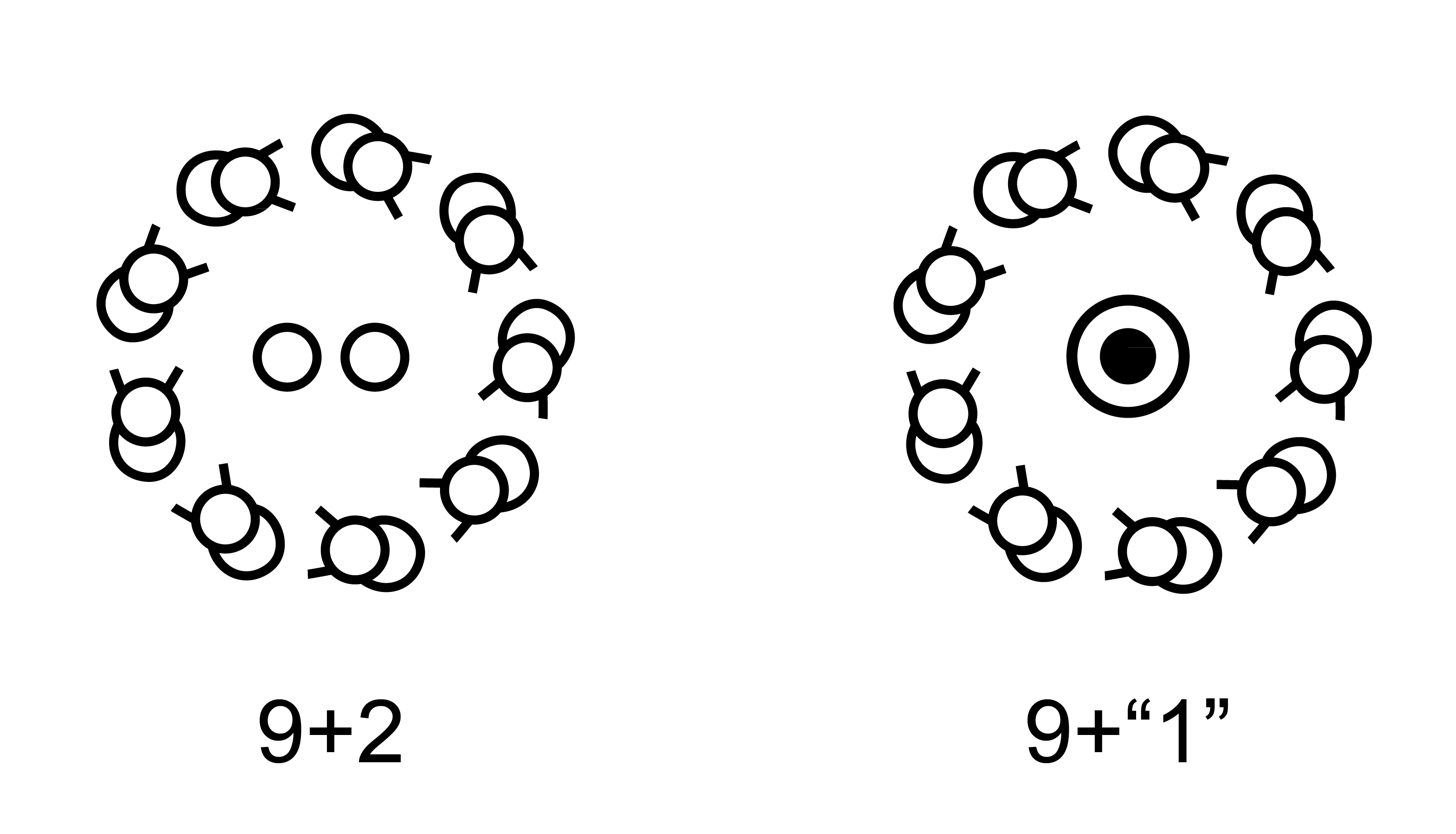
Axoneme 9+2 (usual) and 9+“1” (Trepaxonemata)

The Trepaxonemata are characterised by:

- biflagellate spermatozoa
- axoneme of the spermatozoa with a special type of dense core (9+“1” pattern).

The axoneme in the spermatozoa of species of Trepaxonemata, also called "trepaxoneme" or "trepaxonematan axoneme" has nine peripheral doublets of microtubules as the usual 9+2 axoneme but the two central microtubules are replaced by a central core. This central core appears as a spiral when seen in longitudinal sections in transmission electron microscopy.

This structure is found in all species of Trepaxonemata with very rare exceptions. The trepaxoneme is found only in the Platyhelminthes; no other phylum has this 9+“1” structure. However, the cilia in cells other than spermatozoa in species of Trepaxonemata have the classical 9+2 structure, for example in the epidermis of in protonephridia.

The Trepaxonemata is one of the rare examples of major groups in zoology named after characteristics of spermatozoa, and especially after characteristics observed with transmission electron microscopy.

== Systematics ==
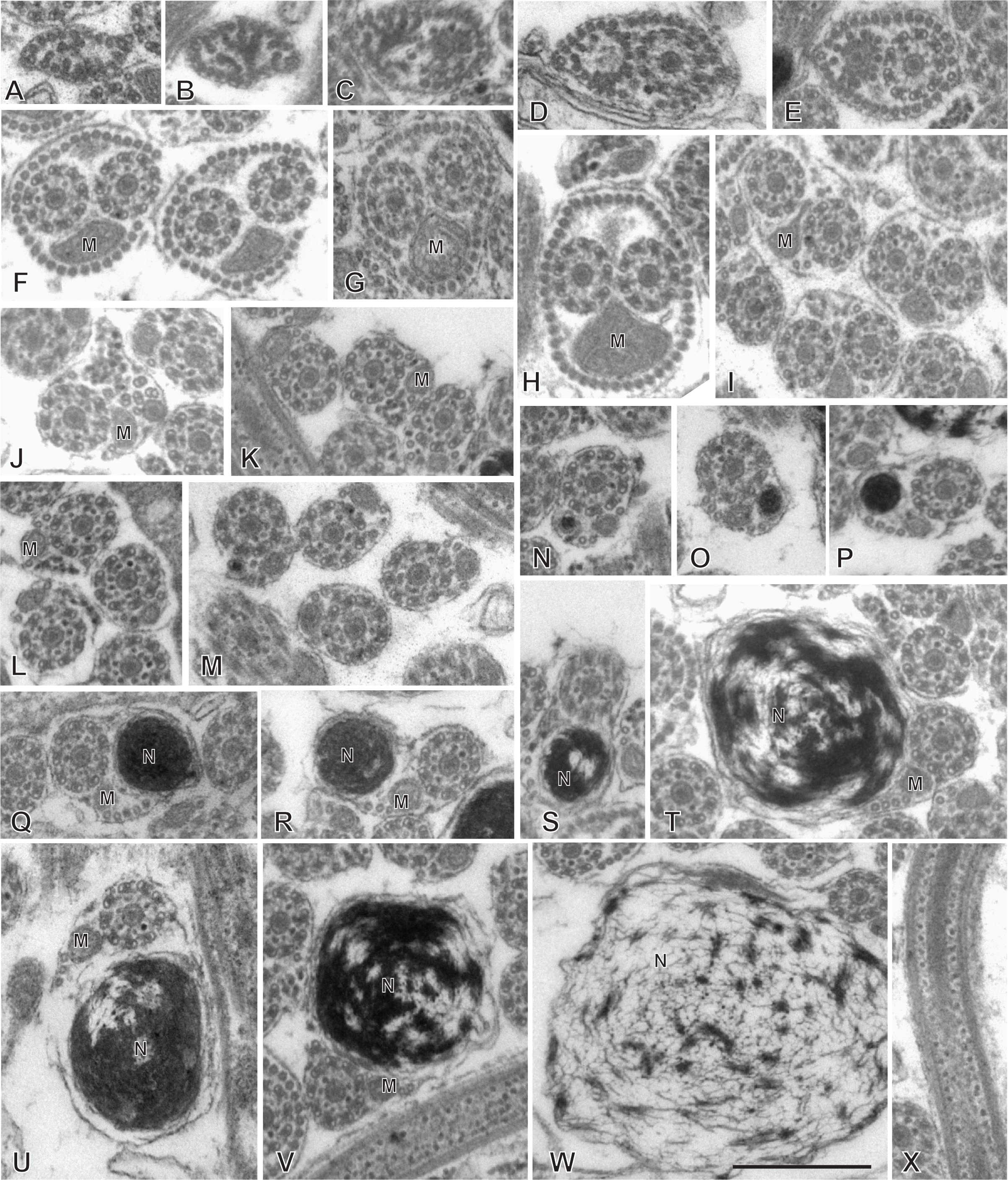
Spermatozoa of Chimaericola leptogaster, a member of the Trepaxonemata. Spermatozoa are biflagellate, with two 9+“1” axonemes.

Current classification of Trepaxonemata based on several morphological and molecular studies:

- Clade Trepaxonemata
  - Clade Amplimatricata
    - Order Lecithoepitheliata
    - Order Polycladida
  - Clade Euneoophora
    - Order Rhabdocoela
    - Order Proseriata
    - Clade Acentrosomata
      - Clade Adiaphanida
        - Order Prolecithophora
        - Order Fecampiida
        - Order Tricladida
      - Clade Bothrioneodermata
        - Order Bothrioplanida
        - Clade Neodermata
          - Order Trematoda
          - Order Monogenea
          - Order Cestoda
