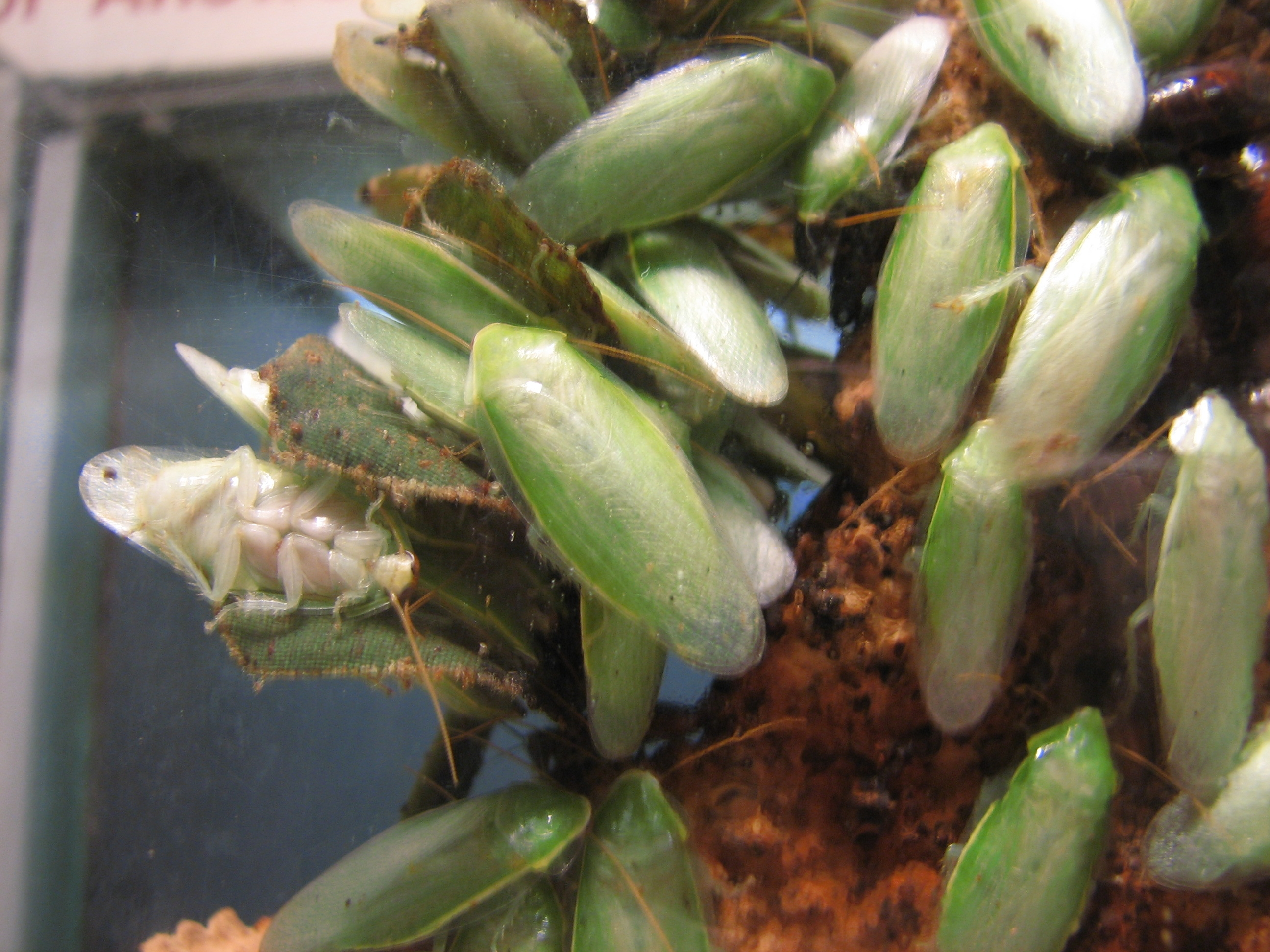
- Panchlora nivea

Scientific classification
- Kingdom: Animalia
- Phylum: Arthropoda
- Clade: Pancrustacea
- Class: Insecta
- Order: Blattodea
- Family: Blaberidae
- Subfamily: Panchlorinae
- Genus: Panchlora; Burmeister, 1838

Species
- See text

= Panchlora =

Genus of cockroaches

Panchlora is a genus of cockroaches in the subfamily Panchlorinae, erected by Hermann Burmeister in 1838. Species are mostly found in the Americas and Africa. Most species in this genus are green in colour, but some are cream or grey.

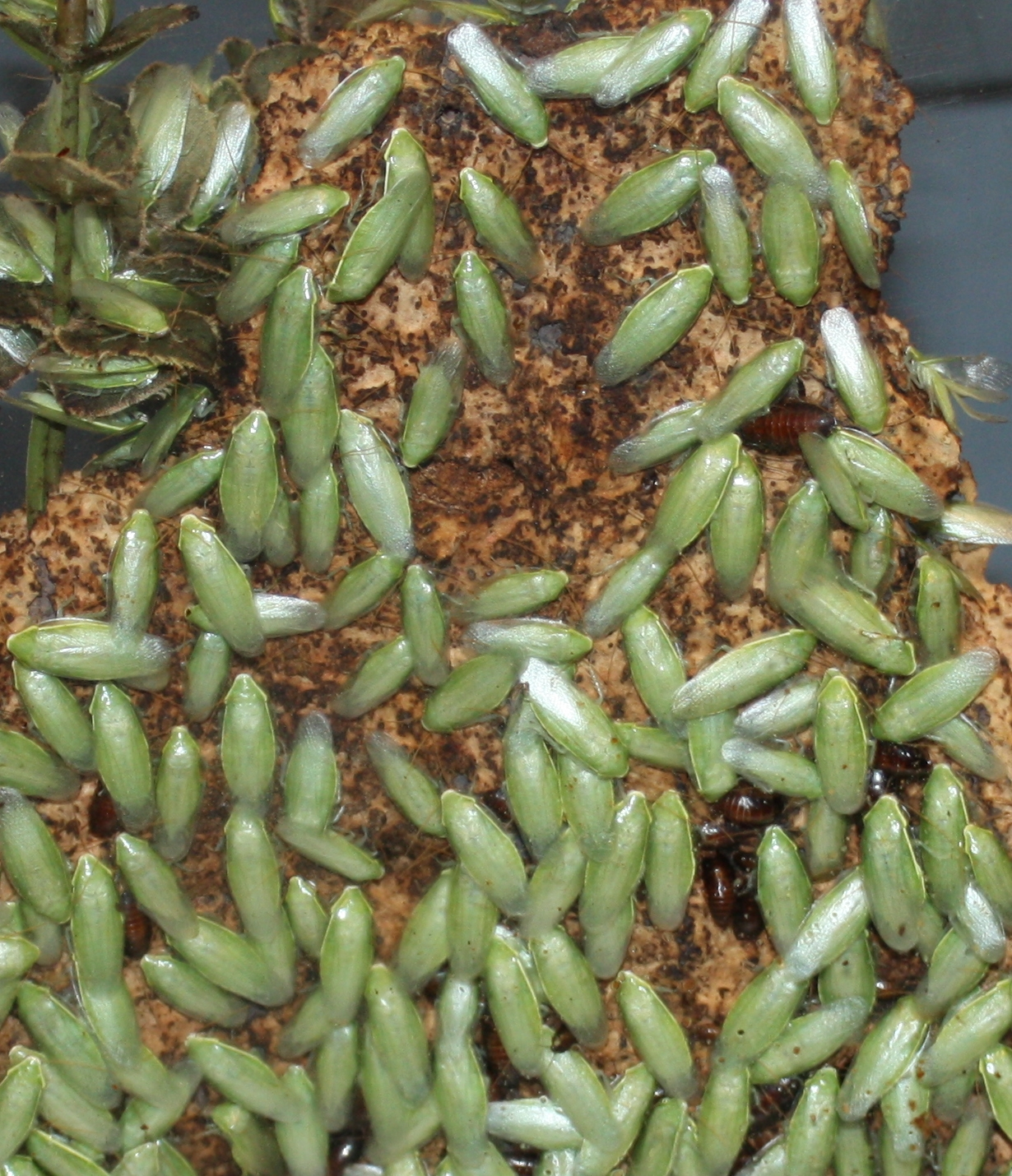
Panchlora nivea

== Species ==
The Cockroach Species File lists:

1. Panchlora acolhua Saussure & Zehntner, 1893
2. Panchlora alcarazzas (Serville, 1838)
3. Panchlora aurora Hebard, 1926
4. Panchlora azteca Saussure, 1862
5. Panchlora bidentula Hebard, 1916
6. Panchlora cahita Hebard, 1922
7. Panchlora camerunensis Borg, 1902
8. Panchlora carioca Rocha e Silva, 1959
9. Panchlora colombiae Hebard, 1919
10. Panchlora cribrosa Saussure & Zehntner, 1893
11. Panchlora dumicola Rocha e Silva & Gurney, 1962
12. Panchlora erronea Saussure, 1870
13. Panchlora exoleta Burmeister, 1838
14. Panchlora festae Giglio-Tos, 1898
15. Panchlora fraterna Saussure & Zehntner, 1893
16. Panchlora gracilis Rocha e Silva & Lopes, 1977
17. Panchlora hebardi Princis, 1951
18. Panchlora heterocercata Princis, 1951
19. Panchlora irrorata Hebard, 1925
20. Panchlora isoldae Lopes & Oliveira, 2000
21. Panchlora itabirae Princis, 1951
22. Panchlora kozaneki Vidlička, 2016
23. Panchlora lancadon Saussure, 1864
24. Panchlora latipennis Saussure & Zehntner, 1893
25. Panchlora maracaensis Lopes & Oliveira, 2000
26. Panchlora mexicana Saussure, 1862
27. Panchlora montezuma Saussure & Zehntner, 1893
28. Panchlora moxa Saussure, 1862
29. Panchlora najas Dohrn, 1888
30. Panchlora nigricornis Walker, 1868
31. Panchlora nigriventris Shelford, 1912
32. Panchlora nivea (Linnaeus, 1758)
33. Panchlora panchlora Princis, 1951
34. Panchlora peruana Saussure, 1864
35. Panchlora petropolitana Rocha e Silva & Lopes, 1977
36. Panchlora prasina Burmeister, 1838
37. Panchlora pulchella Burmeister, 1838 - type species
38. Panchlora quadripunctata Stoll, 1813
39. Panchlora regalis Hebard, 1926
40. Panchlora sagax Rehn & Hebard, 1927
41. Panchlora serrana Rocha e Silva, 1959
42. Panchlora stanleyana Rehn, 1931
43. Panchlora stolata Borg, 1902
44. Panchlora thalassina Saussure & Zehntner, 1893
45. Panchlora tolteca Saussure, 1873
46. Panchlora translucida Kirby, 1903
47. Panchlora viridis (Fabricius, 1775)
48. Panchlora vosseleri Shelford, 1908
49. Panchlora zendala Saussure, 1862
