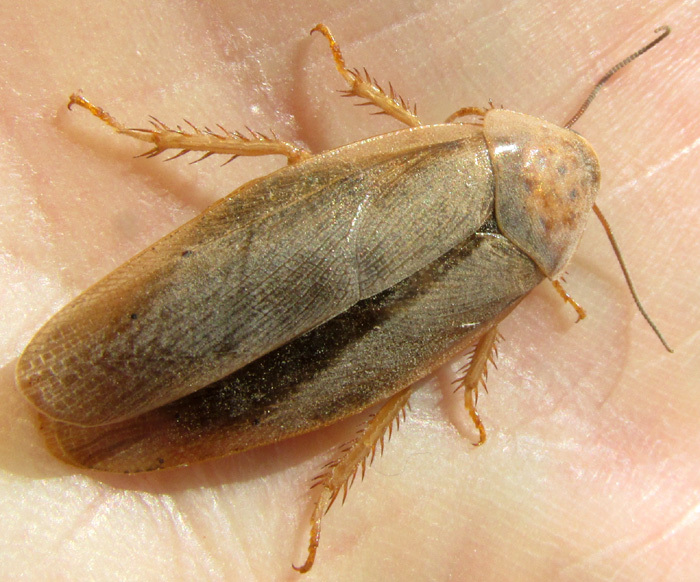

Scientific classification
- Kingdom: Animalia
- Phylum: Arthropoda
- Clade: Pancrustacea
- Class: Insecta
- Order: Blattodea
- Family: Blaberidae
- Genus: Panchlora
- Species: P. azteca

Binomial name
- Panchlora azteca Saussure, 1862

= Panchlora azteca =

Species of cockroaches

Panchlora azteca is a species of insect belonging to the order of the cockroaches, the Blattodea. Published data on the species is quite limited.

== Description ==
In 1838 when Hermann Burmeister erected the genus Panchlora, these were the main features he described distinguishing it from other cockroach genera:

- Antennae are shorter than the body.
- Lower wings are shorter than upper ones, and straight.
- Upper wings are leathery with raised veins; a curved line is impressed around the scutellum.
- The top part of the prothorax, the pronotum, displays an angled margin projecting above the scutellum
- The longest part of the leg, the femur, bears spines.
- Leg tips bear a pair of tarsal claws between which there's a bladder- or pad-like structure, the arolium.
- Both sexes are winged.

In 1862 when Henri Louis Frédéric de Saussure formally described the species Panchlora azteca, here are some of the features he highlighted:

- The body is dark, with a spot between the eyes.
- The pronotum is very curved inward with an outward curved margin.
- Body length is given as 0.027, presumably 2.7 cm (a little over an inch).

For identification, it is worthwhile to review Research-Grade observations of the species submitted by citizen scientists at the iNaturalist website.

== Distribution ==
Panchlora azteca is endemic just to Mexico. It has been documented in the central and southern states of Veracruz and Oaxaca, and the Federal District comprising Mexico City. Also it is found in Mexico's southernmost state of Chiapas. Images on this page show an individual from the central state of Querétaro.

== Habitat ==
In Chiapas, Panchlora azteca is described as one of the most frequently occurring cockroaches in preserved forests. Images on this page show an individual found on the cement floor of a garage at a residence at the edge of a small village in central Mexico adjacent to ranchland and scrub, at an elevation of about 1900 meters (~6200 feet).

== Phylogeny ==
Phylogenetic analysis using six molecular markers suggests that Panchlora azteca belongs to a clade of South American origin, referred to as the Panchlorinae, found in the Americas and Africa. Also, it is the first diverging lineage within the Giant Cockroach Family, the Blaberidae, thus occupying the basal position in the phylogenetic tree – it is sister to the rest of the Blaberidae. This suggests an early formation of the genus within the family.

Another study designates the large genus Panchlora as the only genus of the neotropical Panchlorinae, and suggests that its "earliest diversification of Blaberidae" took place in the Neotropics, though four Panchlora species occur in the African tropics.

== Etymology ==
The genus name Panchlora azteca is based on the Greek πάς, meaning "all, total," and χλοερός, meaning "green." "All green," because the species upon which the genus was erected, Panchlora viridis, was indeed all green.

The species name azteca undoubtedly refers to the ancient Aztecs of central Mexico, where Panchlora azteca mostly has been observed. When Saussure named the species, he described the location from which the type specimen had been collected only as "Mexico calida" – "warm Mexico."

== Gallery ==
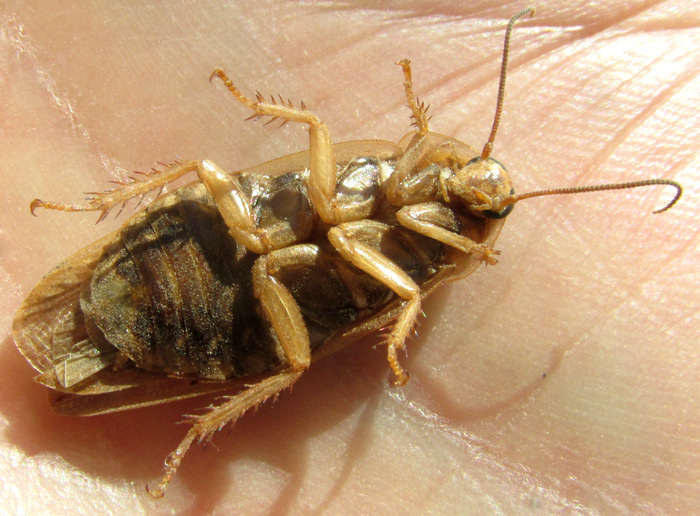
Panchlora azteca underside

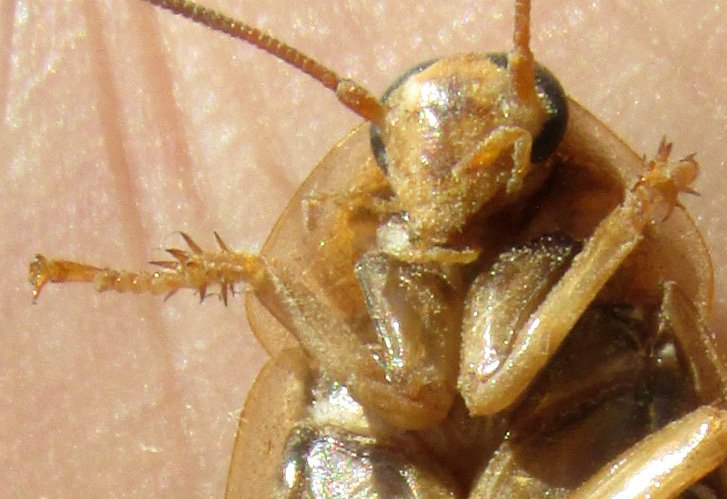
Panchlora azteca front end of underside

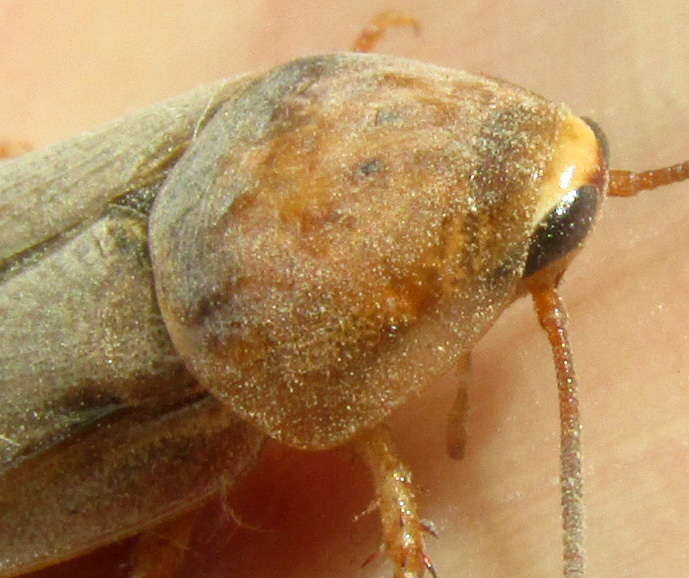
Panchlora azteca front end from the side
