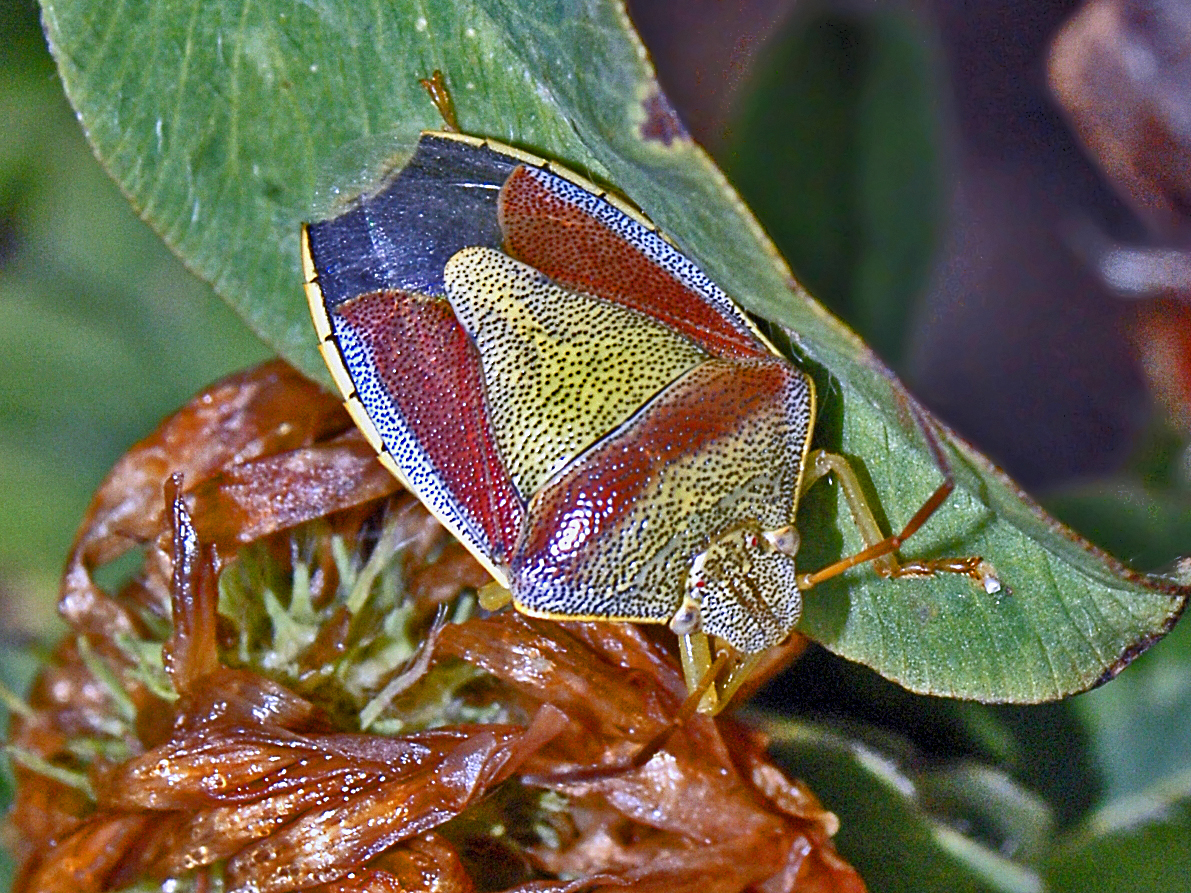
- Late summer adult

Scientific classification
- Domain: Eukaryota
- Kingdom: Animalia
- Phylum: Arthropoda
- Class: Insecta
- Order: Hemiptera
- Suborder: Heteroptera
- Family: Pentatomidae
- Subfamily: Pentatominae
- Tribe: Piezodorini
- Genus: Piezodorus
- Species: P. lituratus

Binomial name
- Piezodorus lituratus (Fabricius, 1794)

Synonyms
- Cimex lituratus Fabricius, 1794; Piezodorus degeeri Fieber, 1860

= Piezodorus lituratus =

Species of bug

Piezodorus lituratus, the gorse shield bug, is a species of Pentatomidae, a family of shield bugs.

== Varieties ==
- Piezodorus lituratus var. lituratus (Fabricius, 1794)
- Piezodorus lituratus var. alliaceus (Germar, 1823)

== Distribution ==
This species is present in Africa, in most of Europe, in Northern Asia (excluding China) and in North America.

== Habitat ==
These shield bugs live in many habitats where host plants are present. They prefer dry and warm habitats, especially with sandy soil.

== Description ==
Piezodorus lituratus can reach a length of 10–13 mm (0.39–0.51 in). These large shieldbugs occur in two adult colour forms. In the spring when they emerge and mate they are predominantly green, while the new generation that appears in the late summer has purplish-red markings on the pronotum and corium. In autumn they have a much paler color, prior to hibernation they may become darker, but after hibernation they are bright green.

In Piezodorus lituratus var. alliaceus the corium shows a uniform yellow-greenish color.

This species could be confused with the green shieldbug, Palomena prasina, but Piezodorus lituratus has a different habitat and red antennae.

== Biology ==
Mating takes place from May to July, the females lay 10 to 20 eggs on the stems, leaves and fruits of the host plants. The nymphs occur until September. The adults of the new summer generation can be found from the end of July or beginning of August. Hibernation occurs in the imago stage.

The main host plants are various legumes (Fabaceae), especially common broom (Sarothamnus scoparius) and dyer's greenweed (Genista tinctoria), but also alfalfa (Medicago sativa), vetches (Vicia species), sweet-clover (Melilotus species), crown vetches (Coronilla species) sainfoins (Onobrychis species), lupin (Lupinus species) and others.

== Life cycle ==
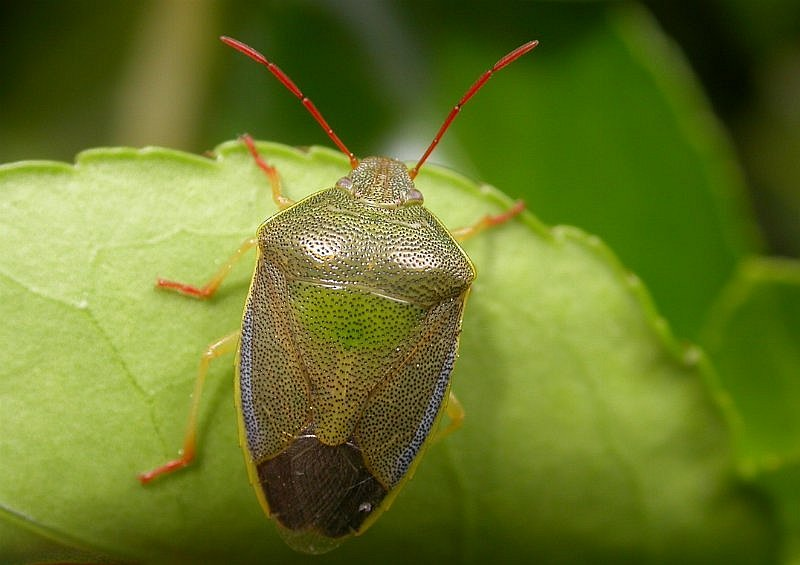
Adult greening after wintering

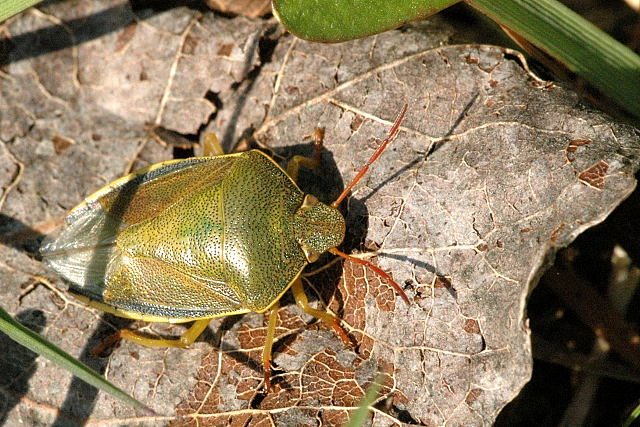
P. lituratus in spring

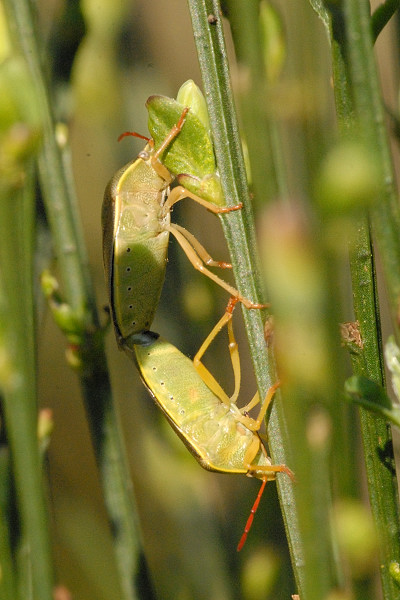
Mating

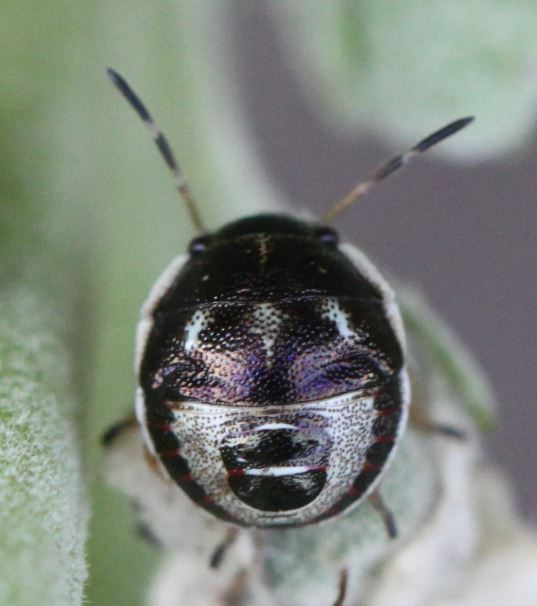
First instar nymph

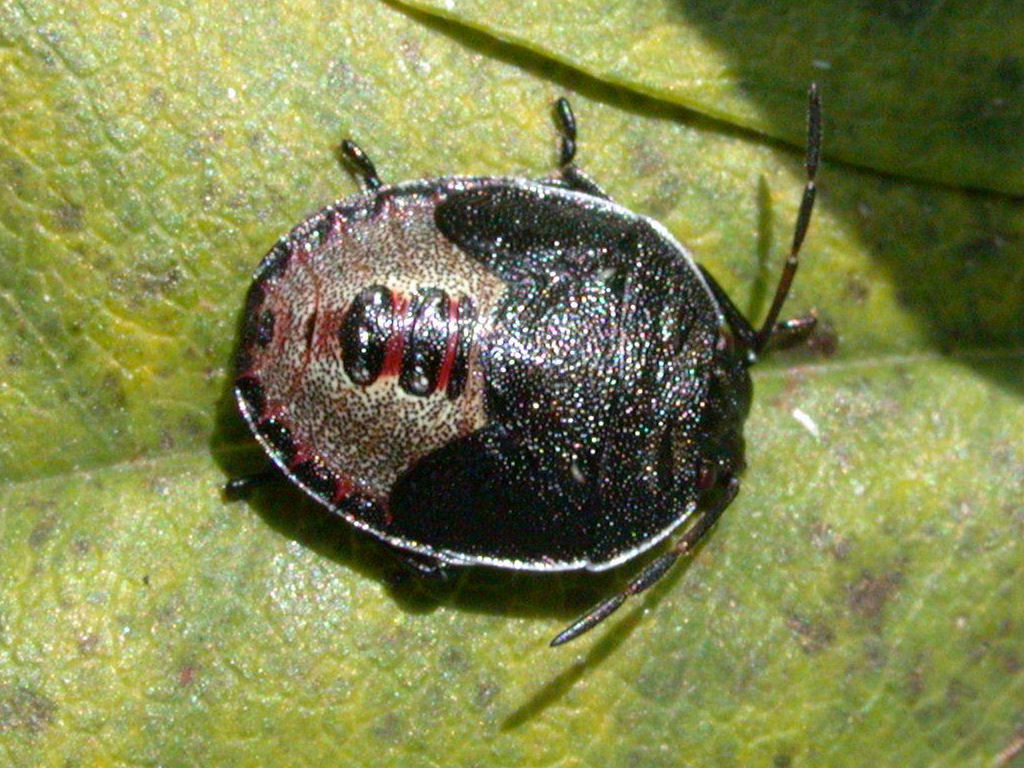
Nymph

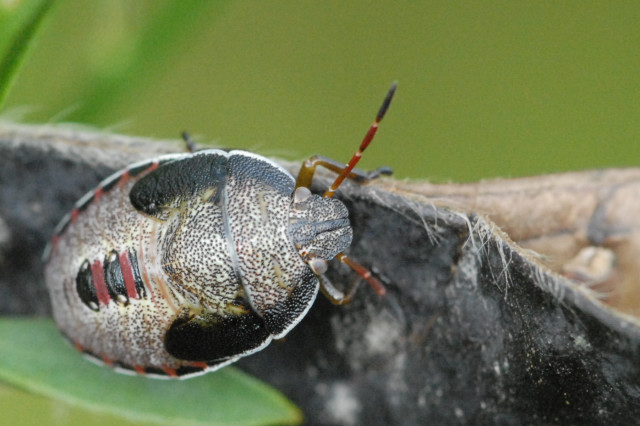
Nymph

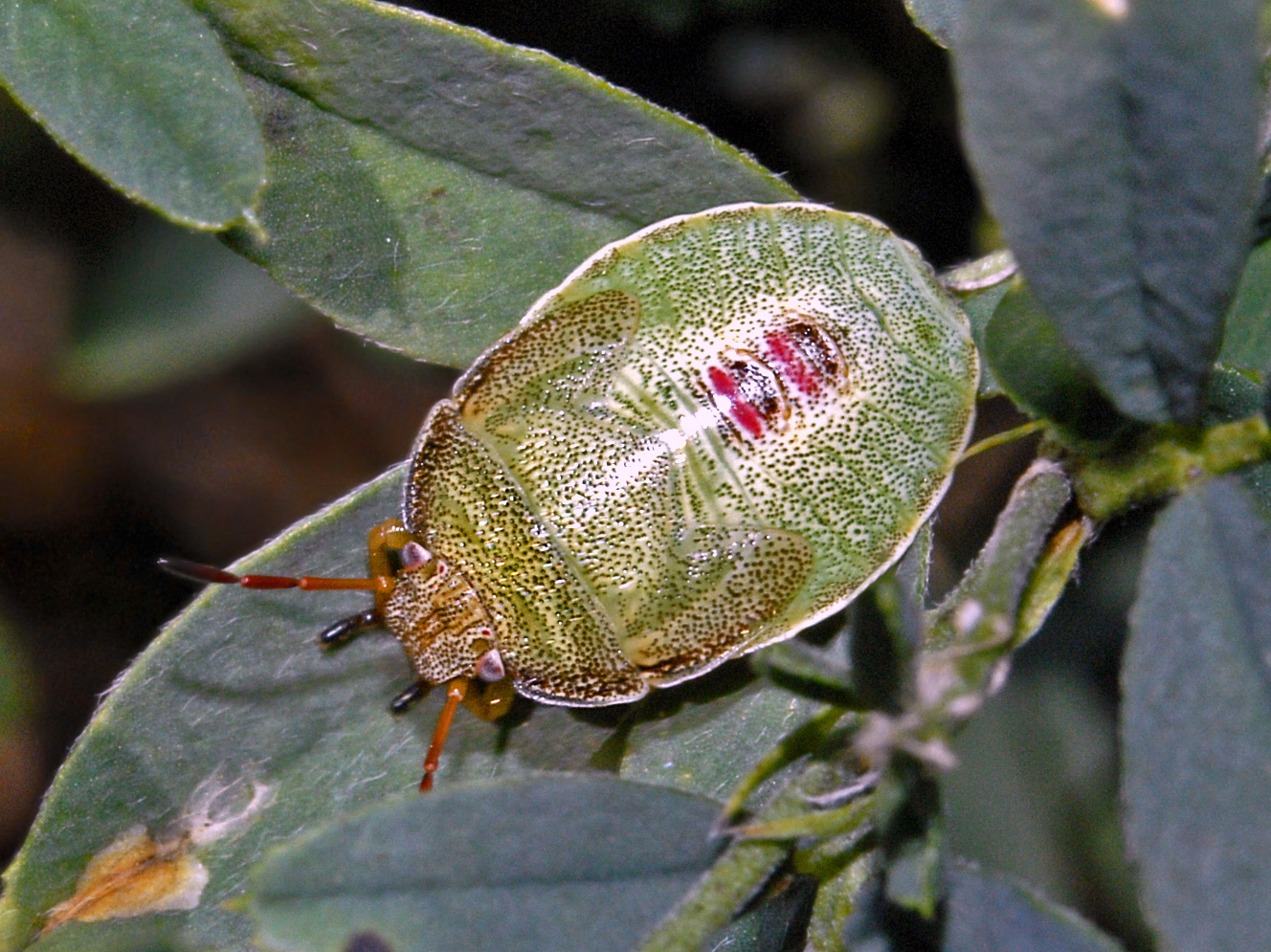
Final instar nymph

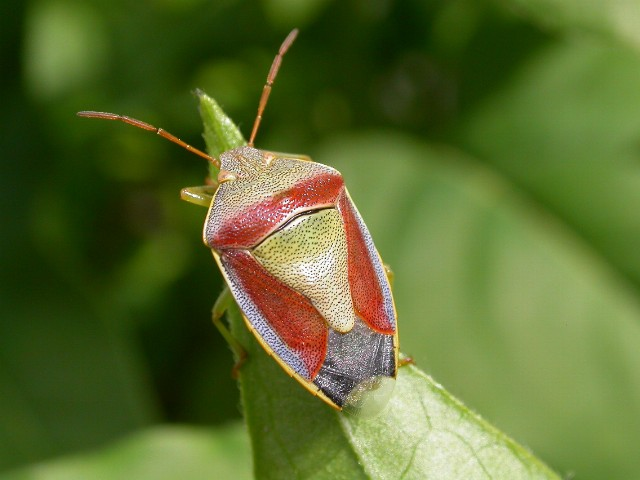
Young adult

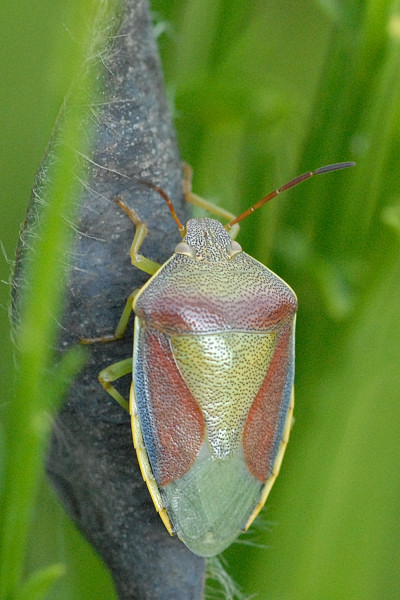
P. lituratus in autumn

== Bibliography ==
- Gärdenfors Ulf, red (2010). Rödlistade arter i Sverige 2010=The 2010 red list of Swedish species. Uppsala: Artdatabanken i samarbete med Naturvårdsverket. Libris 11818177. ISBN 978-91-88506-35-1
- Henry, Thomas J., and Richard C. Froeschner, eds. (1988), Catalog of the Heteroptera, or True Bugs, of Canada and the Continental United States
- Ekkehard Wachmann, Albert Melber, Jürgen Deckert: Wanzen. Band 4: Pentatomomorpha II: Pentatomoidea: Cydnidae, Thyreocoridae, Plataspidae, Acanthosomatidae, Scutelleridae, Pentatomidae. Goecke & Evers, Keltern 2008, ISBN 978-3-937783-36-9.
