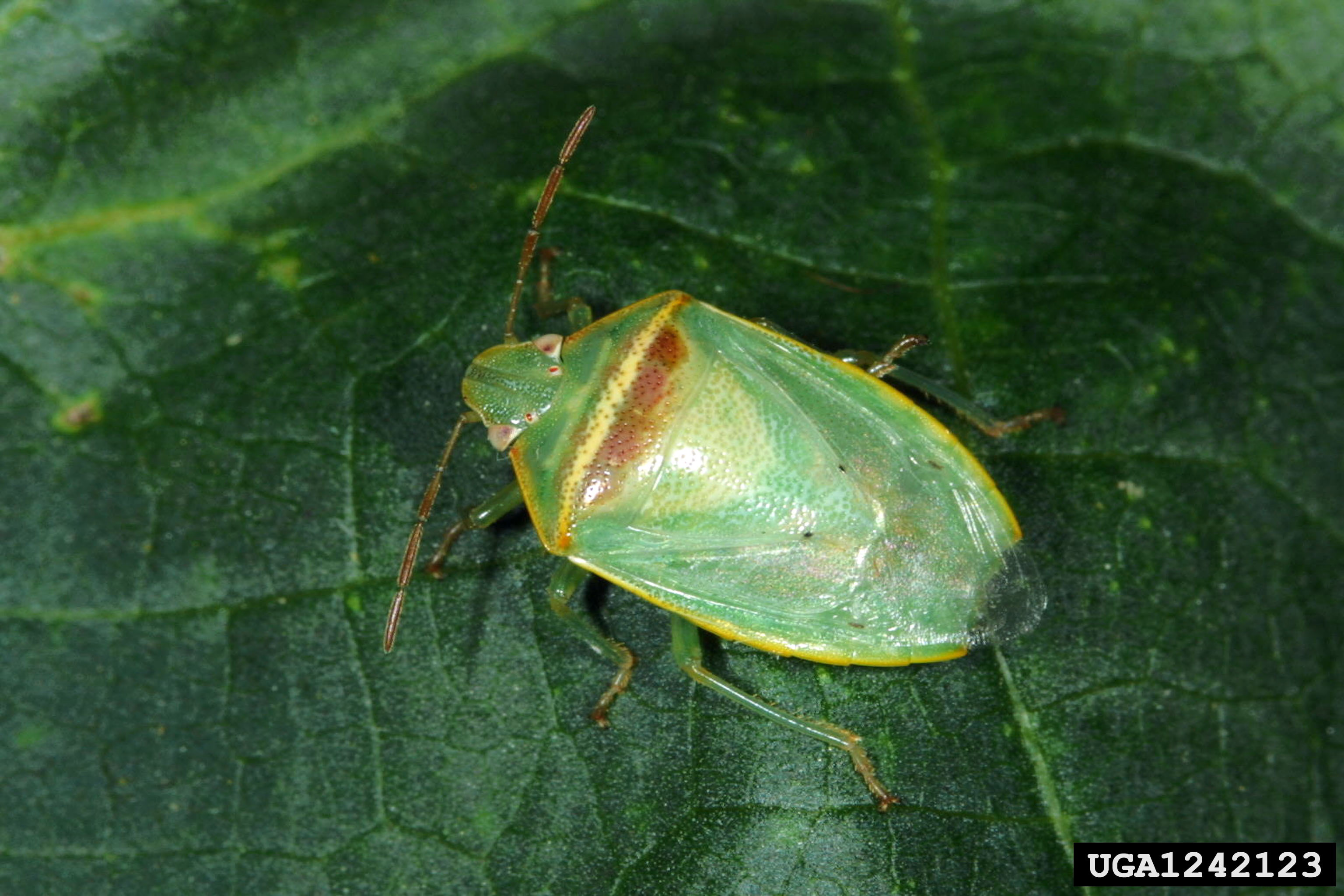

Scientific classification
- Kingdom: Animalia
- Phylum: Arthropoda
- Clade: Pancrustacea
- Class: Insecta
- Order: Hemiptera
- Suborder: Heteroptera
- Family: Pentatomidae
- Genus: Piezodorus
- Species: P. guildinii

Binomial name
- Piezodorus guildinii (Westwood, 1837)

= Piezodorus guildinii =

Species of true bug

Piezodorus guildinii, known generally as red-banded stink bug, is a species of stink bug in the family Pentatomidae. Other common names include the small green stink bug and alfalfa bug.

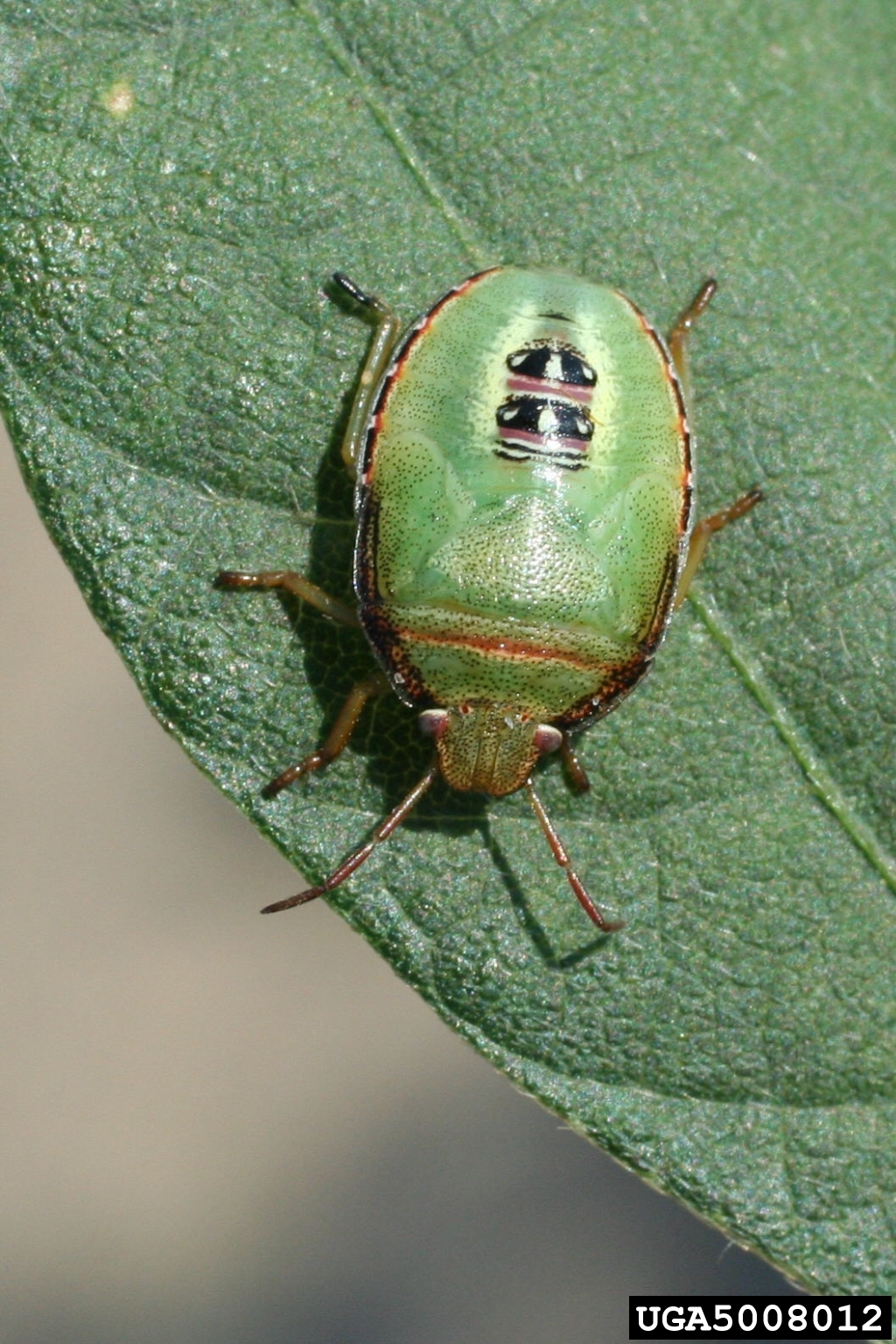
Nymph

Redbanded stink bugs are neotropical and range in geographic distribution from Argentina north to the southern United States, where they can be frequent pests of soybeans. A variety of chemical control options are utilized by soybean growers, though redbanded stink bugs are less susceptible to insecticides than other common species. Insecticides applied for control of the redbanded stink bug (often applied late in the growing season) often consist of broad spectrum chemicals. Alternative control options to control this pest in soybeans are needed, including environmentally friendly and commercially available biological control options like the fungal pathogen Beauveria bassiana. A wide variety of management techniques are available for management and control of this pest.
