= Agrilus prionurus =

Scientific classification
- Domain: Eukaryota
- Kingdom: Animalia
- Phylum: Arthropoda
- Class: Insecta
- Order: Coleoptera
- Suborder: Polyphaga
- Infraorder: Elateriformia
- Family: Buprestidae
- Genus: Agrilus
- Species: A. prionurus

Binomial name
- Agrilus prionurus Chevrolat, 1838

Species of beetle

Agrilus prionurus, the soapberry borer, is a species of metallic wood-boring beetle in the family Buprestidae. It is found in Central America and North America.
