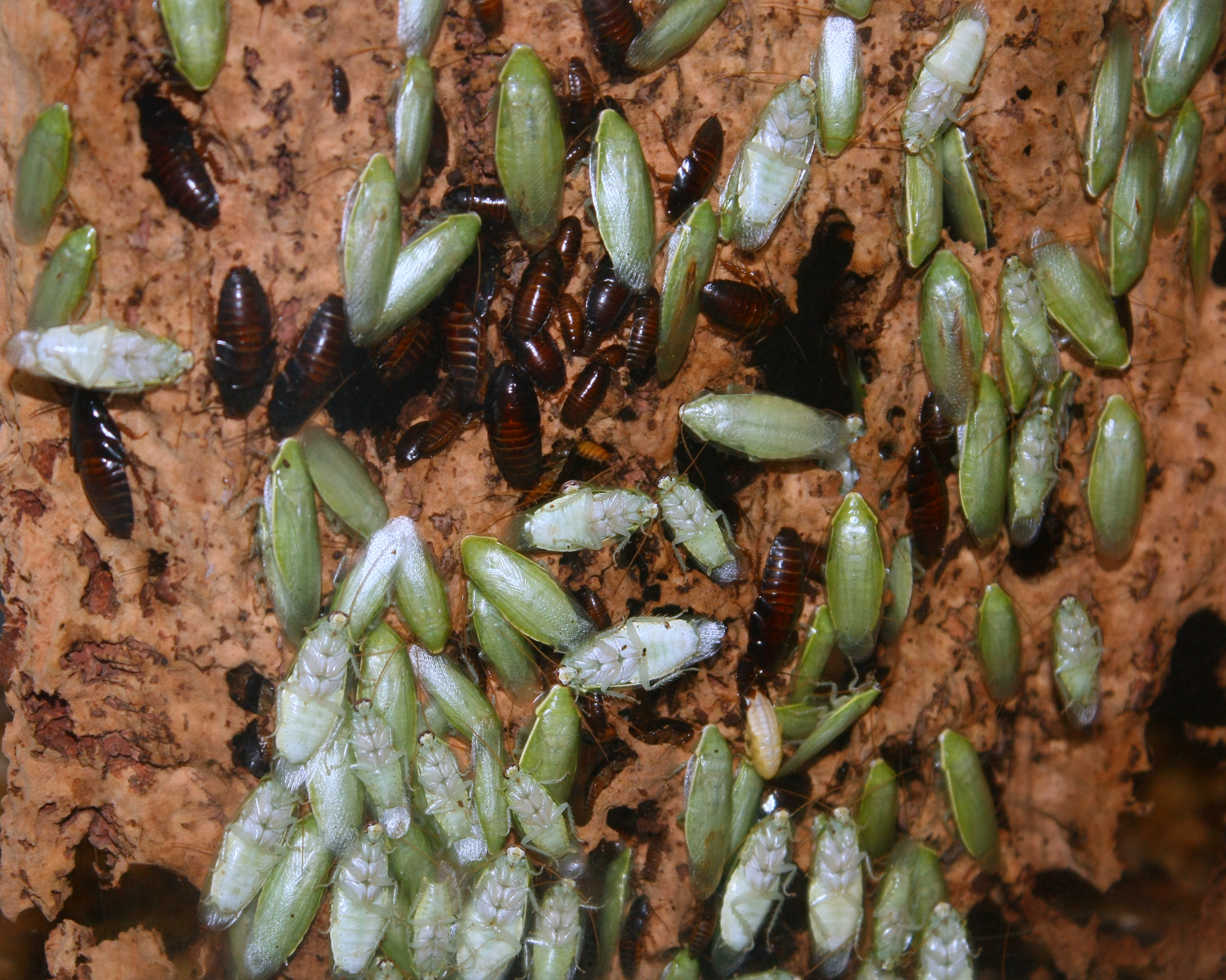
- Adults and nymphs

Scientific classification
- Kingdom: Animalia
- Phylum: Arthropoda
- Clade: Pancrustacea
- Class: Insecta
- Order: Blattodea
- Family: Blaberidae
- Subfamily: Panchlorinae
- Genus: Panchlora
- Species: P. nivea

Binomial name
- Panchlora nivea (Linnaeus, 1758)

Synonyms
- Blatta alba Strøm, 1783; Blatta chlorotica Pallas, 1772; Blatta hyalina Stoll, 1813; Blatta nivea Linnaeus, 1758; Blatta virescens Thunberg, 1826; Ischnoptera lucida Walker, F., 1868; Panchlora cubensis Saussure, 1862; Panchlora luteola Saussure 1864; Panchlora poeyi Saussure 1862; Pycnosceloides aporus Hebard, 1919

= Panchlora nivea =

Species of cockroach

Panchlora nivea, the Cuban cockroach or green banana cockroach, is a small species of cockroach in the subfamily Panchlorinae. It is found in the subtropical or tropical climates of Cuba, the Caribbean and southern US: along the Gulf Coast from Florida to Texas and has been observed as far north as Moncks Corner, South Carolina. Panchlora nivea got into the US through Caribbean fruit shipments.

== Description ==
The females can grow up to 24 mm and the smaller males are 12 to 15 mm long. They are winged and strong fliers, pale green to yellowish green in colour, with a yellow line running up the sides. The nymphs are brown or black and are burrowers.

The ootheca (egg case) is 3–4 mm (0.12–0.16 in) long, is curved, and has indentations that show where the eggs are located. A study found that they contained 28 to 60 eggs (average 46). The ootheca is carried internally by the female until the eggs hatch. At 24 °C (75 °F) the eggs hatch in about 48 days, after which male nymphs mature in about 144 days, and female nymphs mature in about 181 days.

== Habitat ==
Panchlora nivea is usually an outdoor species and is rarely found indoors, so is not considered a pest. The adults can often be found in shrubbery, trees, and plants. The young can be found under logs and other debris. It is often attracted to both indoor and outdoor lights and it is mainly a nocturnal species.

This attractive green cockroach is often a popular pet, partly because it is not an invasive indoor species. It may also be used as food for other pets.
