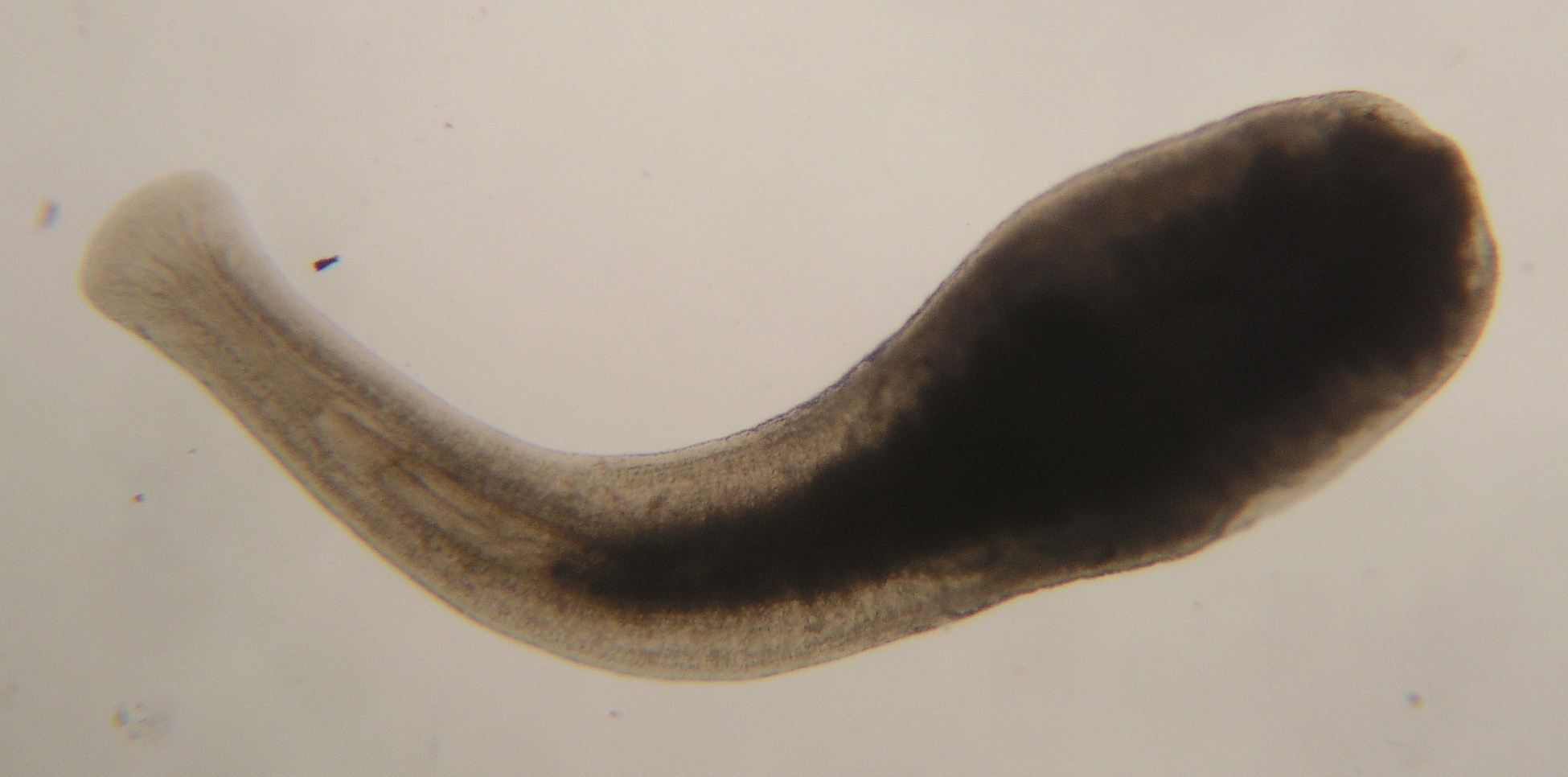
- Geocentrophora baltica

Scientific classification
- Kingdom: Animalia
- Phylum: Platyhelminthes
- Clade: Amplimatricata
- Order: Lecithoepitheliata; Reisinger, 1924

Families
- Gnosonesimidae; Prorhynchidae

= Lecithoepitheliata =

Order of free-living flatworms

The Lecithoepitheliata are an order of rhabditophoran flatworms. They are free-living worms, found in freshwater, soil, and marine environments. However, it is still poorly known their roles in the natural food web.

== Description ==
Members of the order Lecithoepitheliata are distinguished from other flatworms by the presence of four nerve cords and the fact that the ovary forms a single structure that produces both the eggs (ovocytes) and nourishing yolk cells (vitellocytes). The vitellocytes form a follicle around the ovocyte, hence the name of the group, which means "with a yolk epithelium". In most other rhabditophorans, yolk cells, where present at all, are typically formed in glands derived from the ovaries, but separate from them, called vitellaria. Other diagnostic features of this order include the presence of a sharp stylet on the end of the penis, and a simple, unbranched, intestine. The penis lacks a proper pore and is protruded through the mouth.

== Phylogeny ==
The order Lecithoepitheliata is usually classified as belonging to the clade Neoophora, a subgroup of rhabditophoran flatworms distinguished by the presence of ectolecithal eggs, i.e., yolk is stored outside the ovocytes. However, recent molecular studies have grouped Lecithoepitheliata (at least the family Prorrhynchidae) with the order Polycladida, which has endolecithal eggs, i.e., yolk is stored inside the ovocytes as in most animals. Another previous study, which included representatives of both families of Lecithoepitheliata, concluded that Prorhynchidae is the basalmost clade of Neoophora, followed by Gnosonesimidae. In the former scenario, the ectolecithal condition would have evolved independently twice, and in the latter it would have arisen only once, but Lecithoepitheliata would be paraphyletic.

Phylogeny of Lecithoepitheliata in relation to other rhabditophorans according to Laumer & Giribet (2011):

- Rhabditophora
  - Polycladida
  - - Macrostomorpha
    - Neoophora
      - Prorhynchidae (Lecithoepitheliata)
      - - Gnosonesimidae (Lecithoepitheliata)
        - Euneoophora

Phylogeny according to Egger et al. (2015):

- Rhabditophora
  - Macrostomorpha
  - - - Polycladida
      - Prorhynchidae (Lecithoepitheliata)
    - Euneoophora
