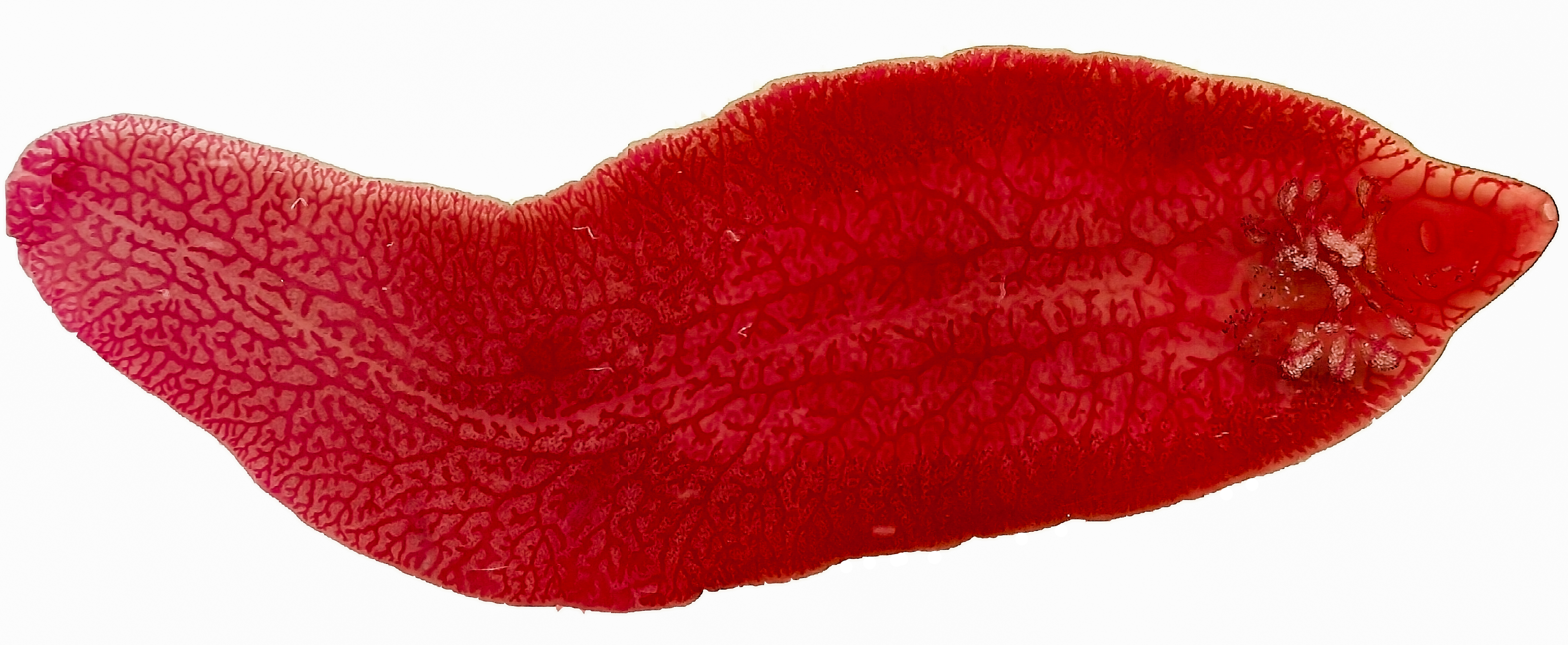
- Fasciola hepatica, a neodermatan

Scientific classification
- Kingdom: Animalia
- Phylum: Platyhelminthes
- Subphylum: Rhabditophora
- Superclass: Neodermata; Ehlers, 1985

Classes
- Trematoda; Monogenea; Cestoda

= Neodermata =

Clade of flatworms

Neodermata is a clade of rhabditophoran flatworms containing the parasitic groups Trematoda, Monogenea and Cestoda.

== Description ==
All neodermatans are parasites, in many groups having a free-swimming larval stage. The most striking feature uniting all neodermatans is that the ciliated epidermis (typical of most flatworms) is cast off in adult worms, being replaced by a syncytium called tegument or neodermis. Other characters found in all neodermatans are related to the anatomy of the protonephridium and the rootlets of epidermal locomotory cilia.

== Relationships with other Platyhelminthes ==
Currently, the monophyly of Neodermata is undisputed, being supported by both morphological and molecular data. It is clear that they evolved from free-living flatworms (turbellarians), but their sister-group was for a long time a matter of debate. The first attempts to reconstruct the phylogeny of flatworms, based on morphological evidence, considered Rhabdocoela to be the sister-group of Neodermata, but this was based on weak morphological similarities and was not supported by molecular studies.

The most recent evidences put the order Bothrioplanida as the sister-group of Neodermata, uniting them in a clade called Bothrioneodermata.

== Internal relationships ==
Many phylogenetic hypotheses have been proposed for the relationships of the major groups which constitute the Neodermata. Caña-Bozada et al. (2025) explored how different molecular markers and datasets influence phylogenetic reconstruction within the Neodermata. They generated 96 unilocus and 9 multilocus phylogenetic trees based on mitochondrial genes (nucleotides and amino acids), as well as nuclear 18S and 28S rRNA genes, using multiple inference programs. Their analyses showed that individual genes often lead to conflicting topologies, and that only certain gene combinations (especially multilocus mitochondrial or mitochondrial + rRNA) yielded more consistent support for the monophyly of the major Neodermata lineages. The monophyly of the Cestoda, Trematoda, Monopisthocotylea and Polyopisthocotylea were found in most analyses, but the monophyly of the Monogenea was not.
