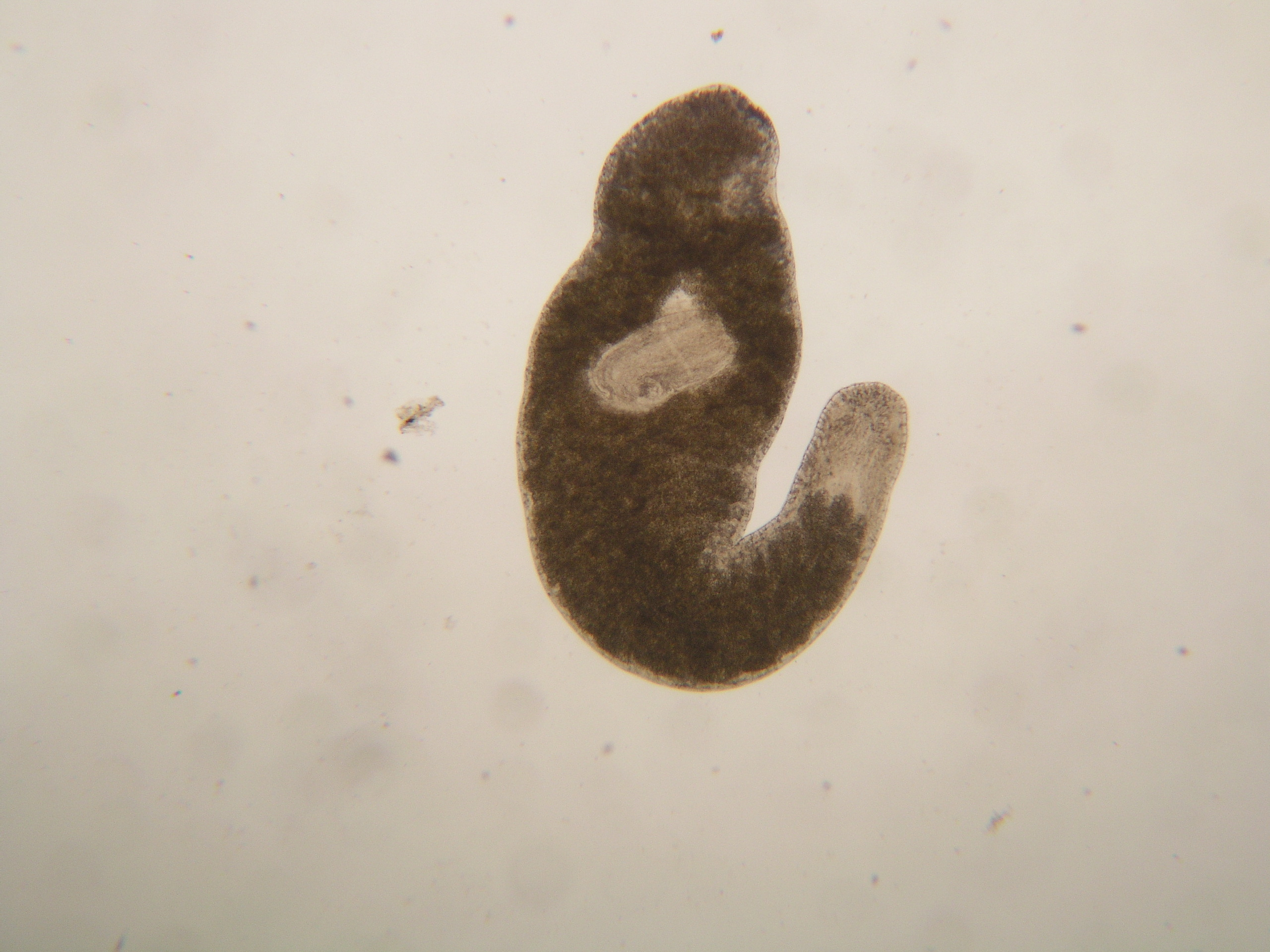
- Bothrioplana semperi

Scientific classification
- Kingdom: Animalia
- Phylum: Platyhelminthes
- Subphylum: Rhabditophora
- Order: Bothrioplanida; Sopott-Ehlers, 1985
- Family: Bothrioplanidae; Vejdovsky, 1895
- Genus: Bothrioplana; Braun, 1881

Type species
- Bothrioplana semperi Braun, 1881

Species
- Bothrioplana semperi Braun, 1881; Bothrioplana sinensis Wang & He, 2016

= Bothrioplana =

Genus of flatworms

Bothrioplana is a genus of freshwater flatworms, the sole genus in the family Bothrioplanidae and order Bothrioplanida.

== Description ==
Species of Bothrioplana are small organisms, usually measuring 2–3 mm in length, but reaching up to 7 mm. The body is transparent, elongate, with a round posterior end and a truncate front end, and lacks eyes. The mouth lies on the ventral side at about the middle of the body, as in most turbellarians, and has a short pharynx. The intestine is tripartite, similarly to what occurs in triclads, having one anterior and two posterior branches. The posterior branches unite behind the copulatory apparatus and form a single branch.

The reproductive system has a pair of testes and a pair of ovaries, as well as a series of vitellaria (yolk-producing glands) that extend along the entire body. Many specimens have the male reproductive system highly reduced or even absent. As a result, parthenogenesis may occur.

== Ecology ==
Individuals of Bothrioplana are usually found in stagnant water, including lakes, pools, wells, and temporary ponds, but may also occur among the moss growing on stones of rivers and brooks. They feed on other small invertebrates, such as Daphnia.

== Classification ==
Bothrioplana was at first classified as a genus in the order Proseriata, but molecular studies have revealed that it is actually the sister-group of Neodermata, the parasitic flatworms.
