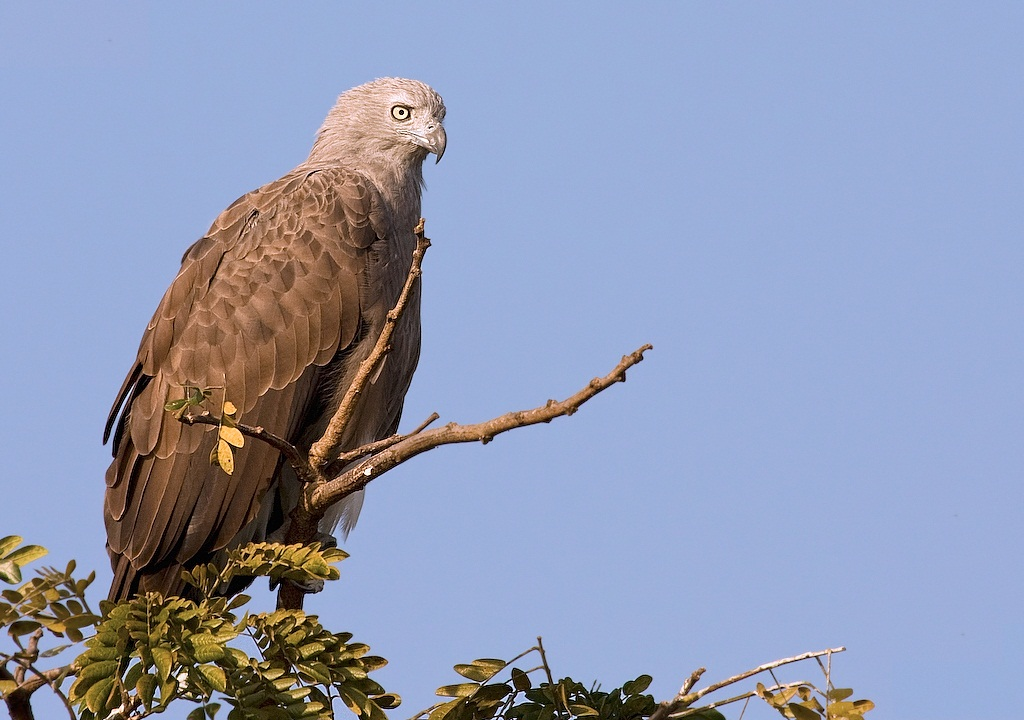
- Fahad’s fish eagle (Icthyophaga humilis)

Scientific classification
- Kingdom: Animalia
- Phylum: Chordata
- Class: Aves
- Order: Accipitriformes
- Family: Accipitridae
- Subfamily: Buteoninae
- Genus: Icthyophaga; Lesson, 1843

Type species
- Falco ichthyaetus Horsfield, 1821

Species
- See text.

= Icthyophaga =

Genus of bird

Icthyophaga (often misspelled as Ichthyophaga, which is a valid genus of flatworms) is a genus of six species of eagles, closely related to the sea eagles in the genus Haliaeetus. In fact, some taxonomic authorities place this genus within Haliaeetus. Both are native to southeastern Asia, from the Indian subcontinent southeast to Sulawesi. They are smaller than the Haliaeetus eagles, though overlapping in size with the smaller species of that genus. They share similar plumage, with grey heads grading into dull grey-brown wings and bodies, and white belly and legs. They differ in tail colour, with the lesser fish eagle having a brown tail, and the grey-headed fish eagle having a white tail with a black terminal band, and also in size, with the lesser fish eagle only about half of the weight of the grey-headed fish eagle.

== Taxonomy ==
The genus was established by René-Primevère Lesson in 1843, to accommodate a single species, the grey-headed fish eagle, which is therefore considered as the type species. Lesson used two spellings for its name: Icthyophaga and Icthyiophaga, but not Ichthyophaga. Despite this, Erwin Stresemann and Dean Amadon mistakenly referred to this genus as Ichthyophaga in their work, and this erroneous usage persisted for a long time; the name Ichthyophaga actually belongs to an entirely different animal: a prolecithophoran turbellarian parasite of fish which was named by Syromjatnikova in 1949.

Traditionally, this genus was believed to include two species: the lesser fish eagle and the grey-headed fish eagle. In 2005, a molecular systematic study based on nuclear and mitochondrial genes merged this genus into Haliaeetus.

In 2023, based on latest molecular systematic studies, the International Ornithologists' Union resurrected Icthyophaga with its right name and transferred four species from Haliaeetus to this genus. Therefore, this genus now includes the following six species:

Genus Icthyophaga – Lesson, 1843 – six species
Common name	Scientific name and subspecies	Range	Size and ecology	IUCN status and estimated population
White-bellied sea eagle	Icthyophaga leucogaster (Gmelin, JF, 1788)	India and Sri Lanka through Southeast Asia to Australia	Size: Habitat: Diet:	LC
Sanford's sea eagle	Icthyophaga sanfordi (Mayr, 1935)		Size: Habitat: Diet:	VU
African fish eagle	Icthyophaga vocifer (Daudin, 1800)	Sub-Saharan Africa	Size: Habitat: Diet:	LC
Madagascar fish eagle	Icthyophaga vociferoides (des Murs, 1845)	Madagascar	Size: Habitat: Diet:	CR
Lesser fish eagle	Icthyophaga humilis (Müller & Schlegel, 1841) Two subspecies: H. h. plumbeus - (Jerdon, 1871); H. h. humilis - (Müller, S & Schlegel, 1841)	Kashmir through southeast India, Nepal, and Burma towards Indochina	Size: Habitat: Diet:	NT
Grey-headed fish eagle	Icthyophaga ichthyaetus (Horsfield, 1821)	Southeast Asia	Size: Habitat: Diet:	NT

== Ecology ==
As both the common and generic names suggest, both fish eagle and the grey-headed fish eagle feed largely on fish, caught mainly in fresh water on lakes and large rivers, but also occasionally in salt water in estuaries and along coasts.
