= Ichthyophaga =

Scientific classification
- Kingdom: Animalia
- Phylum: Platyhelminthes
- Order: Fecampiida
- Family: Piscinquilinidae; Laumer & Giribet, 2017
- Genus: Ichthyophaga; Syromjatnikova, 1949
- Species: I. subcutanea

Binomial name
- Ichthyophaga subcutanea Syromjatnikova, 1949

Synonyms
- Piscinquilinus subcutaneus Sluys & Kawakatsu, 2005 (superfluous name)

Genus of parasitic flatworms

Ichthyophaga is a monotypic genus of flatworm belonging to the monotypic family Piscinquilinidae; its sole described species is Ichthyophaga subcutanea. When described in 1949, this species was one of the few turbellarians known to be a parasite of vertebrates, along with Micropharynx, though I. subcutanea is an endoparasite. The type specimens, the largest of which were 4.4 mm (0.17 in) long, were recovered by one V. A. Dogel from within the tissues of Cottoid fish caught around Vladivostok; the fish species parasitized being Bero elegans and Hexagrammos decagrammus. It was historically placed within the family Genostomatidae of Alloeocoela due to a similar morphology and parasitic lifestyle, but is now placed within its own monotypic family after an analysis of flatworm 18S and 28S rRNA in 2017.

I. subcutanea is brick red, while a turbellarian parasite also assigned to Ichthyophaga were yellow-tinted to off-white; this undescribed species causes black spot disease (sometimes known as "black ich") to Naso unicornis tang.

The 1843 fish eagle genus name Icthyophaga, under an incorrect but widely used [mis-]spelling "Ichthyophaga" (see below) was at one point deemed a senior homonym of the flatworm, which would render Ichthyophaga Syromjatnikova an invalid name. To resolve this, in 2005, the taxonomists Sluys and Kawakatsu proposed the new name Piscinquilinus to replace Ichthyophaga Syromjatnikova. However, inspection of Icthyophaga's original description shows that the original describer René Lesson provided the spellings Icthyophaga and Icthyiophaga, but not Ichthyophaga; this decision was reinforced when the first reviser, C.W. Richmond in 1917, selected Icthyophaga as the correct spelling for the eagle genus. A proposal (Case 3603) initially requested that the ICZN Commission should conserve both the flatworm and bird genus names as separate entities, but this was deemed unnecessary by the Commission; all that was needed was for the taxonomic community to stop using Piscinquilinus, and to not use Ichthyophaga when referring to the fish eagle Icthyophaga Lesson, 1843.
