= Pseudostomum klostermanni =

Scientific classification
- Kingdom: Animalia
- Phylum: Platyhelminthes
- Order: Prolecithophora
- Family: Pseudostomidae
- Genus: Pseudostomum
- Species: P. klostermanni

Binomial name
- Pseudostomum klostermanni (Graff, 1874)

Synonyms
- Cylindrostoma elegans Pereyaslawzewa, 1892; Cylindrostoma inerme (Hallez, 1879); Cylindrostoma klostermanni Graff, 1874; Pseudostomum elegans (Pereyaslawzewa, 1892); Pseudostomum inerme (Hallez, 1879); Pseudostomum klostermani (v.Graff, 1874); Rusalka pontica Uljanin, 1870; Turbella inerme (Hallez, 1879); Turbella klostermanni Graff, 1874

Species of flatworm

Pseudostomum klostermanni is a species of flatworm in the family Pseudostomidae. It is a marine species found in the Black and Mediterranean Seas and in the European waters of the North Atlantic Ocean.
