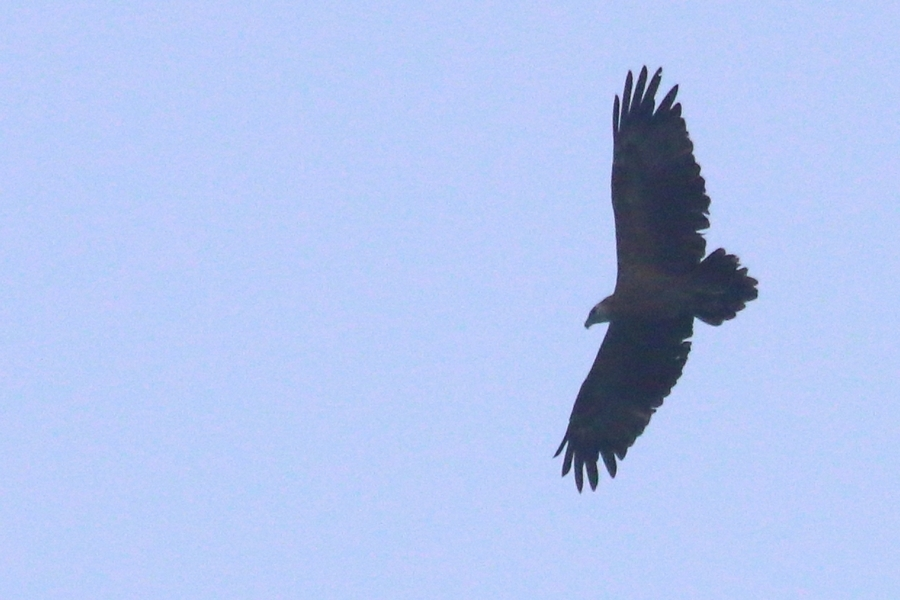

Conservation status
- Vulnerable (IUCN 3.1)
- CITES Appendix II

Scientific classification
- Kingdom: Animalia
- Phylum: Chordata
- Class: Aves
- Order: Accipitriformes
- Family: Accipitridae
- Genus: Icthyophaga
- Species: I. sanfordi

Binomial name
- Icthyophaga sanfordi (Mayr, 1935)

= Sanford's sea eagle =

Species of bird

Sanford's sea eagle (Icthyophaga sanfordi), also known as Sanford's fish eagle or the Solomon eagle, is a sea eagle endemic to the Solomon Islands archipelago.

== Taxonomy ==
Sanford's sea eagle was discovered by and named after Dr Leonard C. Sanford, a trustee for the American Museum of Natural History. The first description was by Ernst Mayr in 1935. The "sea eagle" name is used to distinguish the species of the genus Haliaeetus from the closely related Icthyophaga true fish eagles. The species was described in 1935 by Ernst Mayr who noticed that earlier observers had overlooked it, thinking it was a juvenile of the white-bellied sea eagle. It forms a superspecies with the white-bellied sea eagle. As in other sea eagle species pairs, the other taxon is white-headed. These two are genetically very close, it seems; their lineages separated not longer than 1 million years ago, probably only in the Middle Pleistocene, a few 100,000 years ago. Both share a dark bill, talons, and eyes with the other Gondwanan sea eagles.

== Description ==
It can reach a length of 70–90 cm (28–35 in) and a weight between 1.1 and 2.7 kg (2.4 and 6.0 lb). Its wingspan is 165–185 cm (5.41–6.07 ft). It is the only large predator on the Solomon Islands. The eagles inhabit coastal forests and lakes up to an altitude of about 1500 m above sea level.

Their plumage is whitish brown to bright brown on the head and the neck. The underparts are brown to reddish brown and dark brown. The upperparts are darkish brown to gray-black. The eyes are bright brown. Uniquely among sea eagles, this species has an entirely dark tail throughout its life.

== Breeding ==
The breeding season is from August to October. The nest consists of two eggs.

== Diet ==
The diet consists of mainly of tideline carrion, fish, molluscs, crabs, tortoises, and sea snakes, and more rarely birds and megabats snatched from the rainforest canopy. It has also been reported to feed opportunistically on the northern common cuscus.

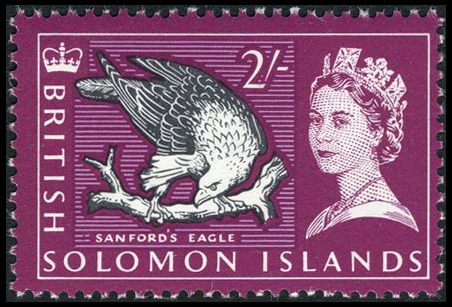
Sanford's eagle on a stamp of the British Solomon Islands (1965).

== In culture ==
The eagle is often illustrated on postage stamps of the Solomon Islands.

== Footnotes ==
References

- BirdLife International (2023). "Haliaeetus sanfordi". IUCN Red List of Threatened Species. 2023 e.T22695105A221426607. doi:10.2305/IUCN.UK.2023-1.RLTS.T22695105A221426607.en.
- "Species factsheet: Sanford's Sea-eagle Haliaeetus sanfordi". BirdLife DataZone. BirdLife International. 2023.

Cited works

- del Hoyo, J.; Elliott, A.; Sargatal, J., eds. (1994). Handbook of the Birds of the World. Vol. 2. Barcelona: Lynx Edicions. ISBN 84-87334-15-6.
- Heinsohn, Tom (2000). "Predation by the White-breasted Sea Eagle Haliaeetus leucogaster on phalangerid possums in New Ireland, Papua New Guinea". Emu. 100 (3): 245–46. Bibcode:2000EmuAO.100..245H. doi:10.1071/MU00913.
- Wink, M.; Heidrich, P.; Fentzloff, C. (1996). "A mtDNA phylogeny of sea eagles (genus Haliaeetus) based on nucleotide sequences of the cytochrome b gene" (PDF). Biochemical Systematics and Ecology. 24 (7–8): 783–791. Bibcode:1996BioSE..24..783W. doi:10.1016/S0305-1978(96)00049-X.
