= Cylindrostomidae =

Scientific classification
- Kingdom: Animalia
- Phylum: Platyhelminthes
- Order: Prolecithophora
- Family: Cylindrostomidae

Family of flatworms

Cylindrostomidae is a family of flatworms belonging to the order Prolecithophora.

Genera:

- Allostoma van Beneden, 1861
- Allostoma Westblad, 1955
- Cylindrostoma Örsted, 1845
- Einarhelmins Karling, 1993
- Enterostomula Reisinger, 1926
- Euxinia Graff, 1911
- Monoophorum Böhmig, 1890
- Pregermarium Stirewalt, Ferguson & Kepner, 1942
- Thallagus Marcus, 1951
