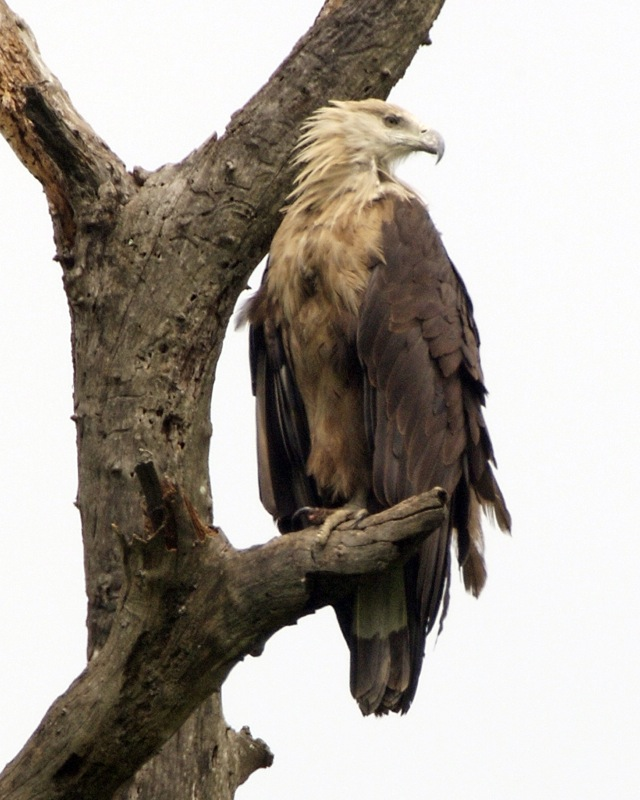
- In Kaziranga National Park

Conservation status
- Endangered (IUCN 3.1)
- CITES Appendix II

Scientific classification
- Kingdom: Animalia
- Phylum: Chordata
- Class: Aves
- Order: Accipitriformes
- Family: Accipitridae
- Genus: Haliaeetus
- Species: H. leucoryphus

Binomial name
- Haliaeetus leucoryphus (Pallas, 1771)

Synonyms
- Aquila leucorypha Pallas, 1771

= Pallas's fish eagle =

Species of bird

Pallas's fish eagle (Haliaeetus leucoryphus), also known as Pallas's sea eagle or band-tailed fish eagle, is a large, brownish sea eagle. It breeds in the east Palearctic in Kazakhstan, Russia, Tajikistan, Turkmenistan, Uzbekistan, Mongolia, China, India, Nepal, Bangladesh, Myanmar and Bhutan. It is listed as Endangered on the IUCN Red List. It is partially migratory, with Central Asian birds wintering among the southern Asian birds in northern India, and also further west to the Persian Gulf.

== Description ==
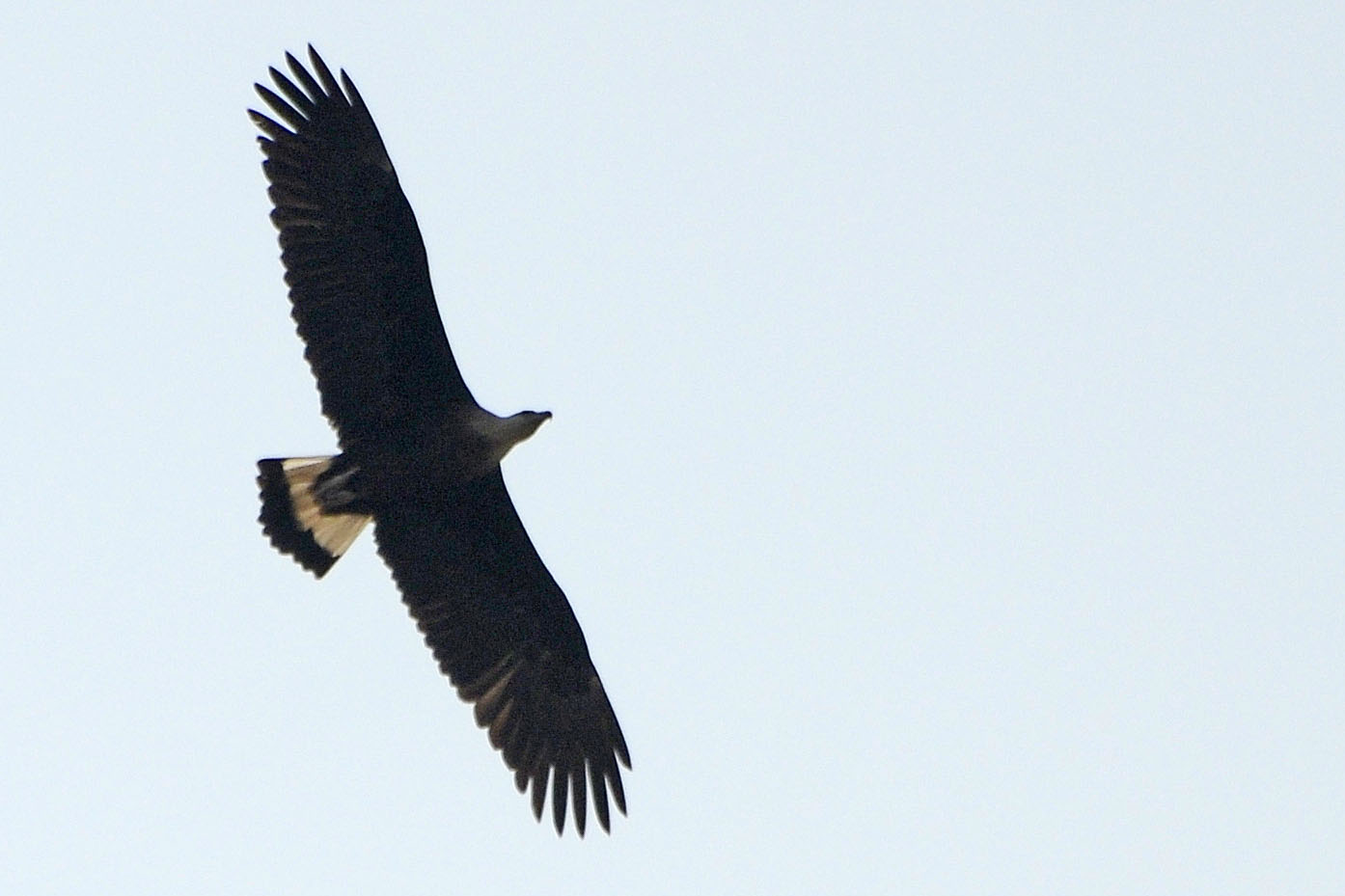
Pallas's fish eagle in flight at Jim Corbett National Park

The Pallas's fish eagle has a light sandy-brown hood and a whitish face. The wings are darker brown and the back rufous. The long, slender wings (particularly slender for a sea eagle) are rather dark brown underneath. The tail is black with a wide, distinctive white stripe. Juveniles are overall darker, cooler brown with no band on the tail but with several pale areas on the wing, including the underwing coverts and inner primaries. This results in underwings that have a white band in young fish eagles. It takes until the 4th year or so to obtain adult plumage. Among related species, it mainly overlaps in range with the quite dissimilar much shorter winged and slightly smaller grey-headed fish eagle and scarcely with the larger, bulkier and much broader winged white-tailed eagle, which also seldom resembles the coloring of the Pallas's. This fairly large species measures 72 to 85 cm (28 to 33 in) in length with a wingspan of 180–215 cm (71–85 in). Females weigh 2.1 to 3.7 kg (4.6 to 8.2 lb), with this sample of nine averaging 3.2 kg (7.1 lb), and are slightly larger than males at 2.03 to 3.3 kg (4.5 to 7.3 lb), in ten that weighed an average of 2.6 kg (5.7 lb). However, in some cases Pallas's fish eagles have been reported to weigh as much as 4 to 5.5 kg (8.8 to 12.1 lb) and span as much as much as 240 cm (94 in). Thus, their size falls just slightly under the large northern sea eagles (i.e. bald, white-tailed and Steller's) and broadly similar to slightly larger than the sea eagles of more tropical central distribution.

== Behaviour and ecology ==
=== Diet ===
Its diet consists primarily of large freshwater fish. However, Pallas's fish eagle seems to have a broadly opportunistic diet much like better known sea eagles. They also regularly prey upon birds, especially water birds. Other prey reportedly can include mammals, including leporids and rodents, frogs, reptiles, including snakes and terrapins, insects (i.e. wasp larvae) and carrion. Their prey in Bangladesh were reported to consist of mrigal carp, rohu, catla, ilish, Chitala chitala, Mystus cavasius, Ompok bimaculatus and Wallago attu. Known water bird prey can include pheasant-tailed jacana, lesser whistling duck, ferruginous duck, common pochard and little grebe. Pallas's fish eagles are known to attack quite large (i.e. about their own size or somewhat larger) adult water birds including greylag geese, bar-headed geese and Demoiselle crane by assaulting them on the surface of the water and then flying off with the kill. Since the greylag goose species is slightly heavier than the eagle, this is one of the greatest weight-lifting feats ever recorded for a flying bird. Another case of lifting a great load was recorded at the Yamuna River in north-central India, where an eagle captured a huge carp and flew with the struggling fish very low over the water, before dropping it in response to gunfire. The carp was found to have weighed 6.5 kg (14 lb), which is probably roughly twice the weight of the eagle carrying it. How they interact with other raptors is not well understood. However, observations of wintering Pallas's fish eagles in Bharatpur suggest they may dominate several other eagle species, select the highest perches and have the highest daily food intake, including over similarly sized eagles such as eastern imperial eagles and steppe eagles.

== Taxonomy ==
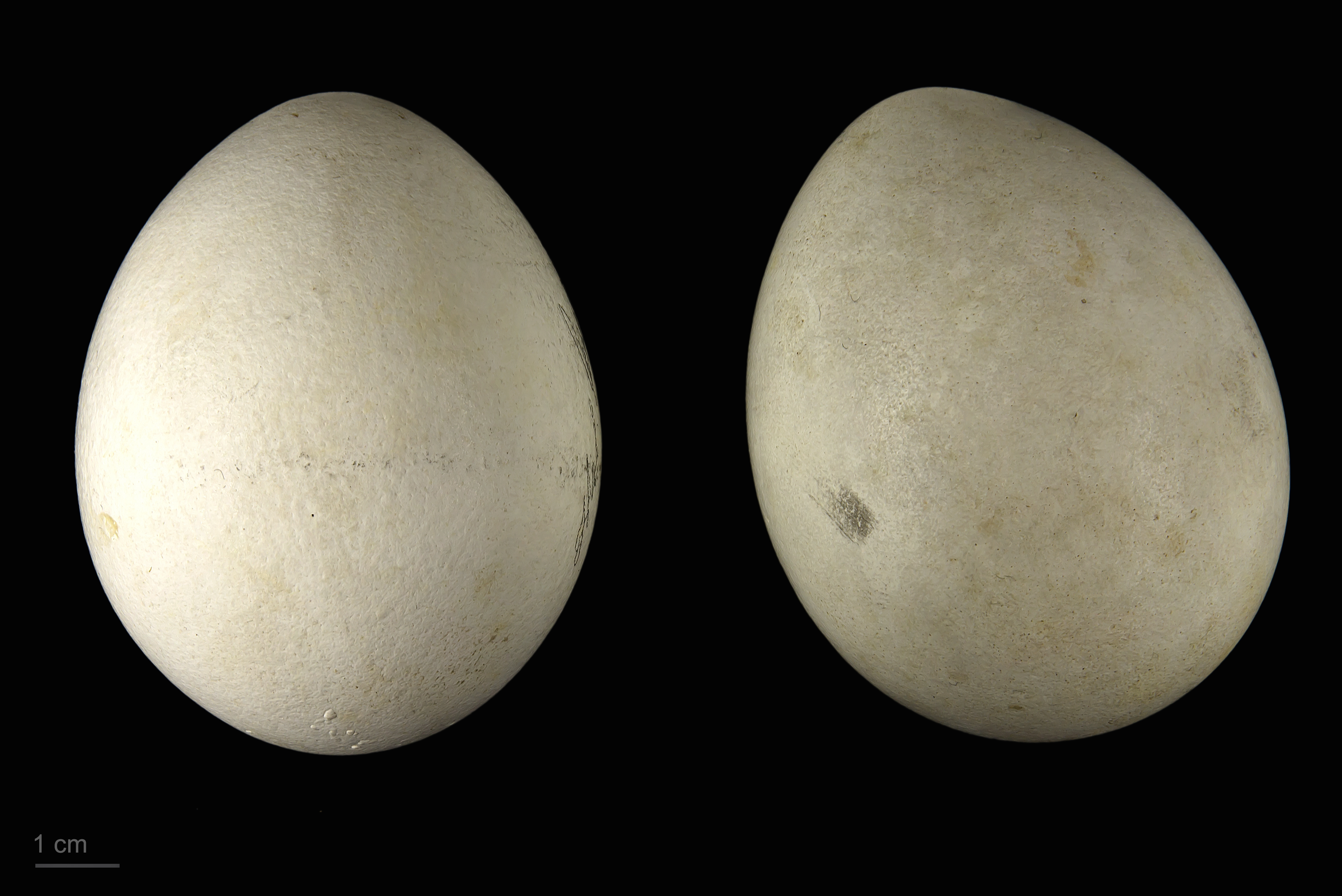
Pallas's fish eagle eggs

Aquila leucorypha was the scientific name proposed by Peter Simon Pallas in 1771, who first described a Pallas's fish eagle that he encountered during his travels in eastern Siberia. In the 19th century, it was also placed in the genera Falco and Haliaeetus by different authors.

This species is the hardest-to-place sea-eagle. Among the species of its genus, it has no close living relatives. mtDNA cytochrome b sequence data is unable to reliably suggest a phylogenetic place for it among the sea-eagles. However, some information can be drawn from the molecular data, and especially from morphology and biogeography:

This species retains the ancestral dark eye, bill, and talons of the first sea-eagles, shared with the older tropical lineage. It is peculiar insofar as it has a black band at the end of the tail in adult birds, similar to juvenile Madagascar fish eagles (which look like a smaller, darker version of this bird, but are not very closely related). Its distribution indicates that this species evolved fairly independently of other sea-eagle lineages, but the molecular data tentatively suggests it is possibly closer to the Holarctic species. It diverged from its common ancestor with other species soon after the Holarctic and the tropical lineages split. Dependent on the interpretation of a possible Early Oligocene sea-eagle fossil from Egypt, this happened either at the very start or the end of the Oligocene, somewhere between 34 and 25 mya.

== Distribution and habitat ==
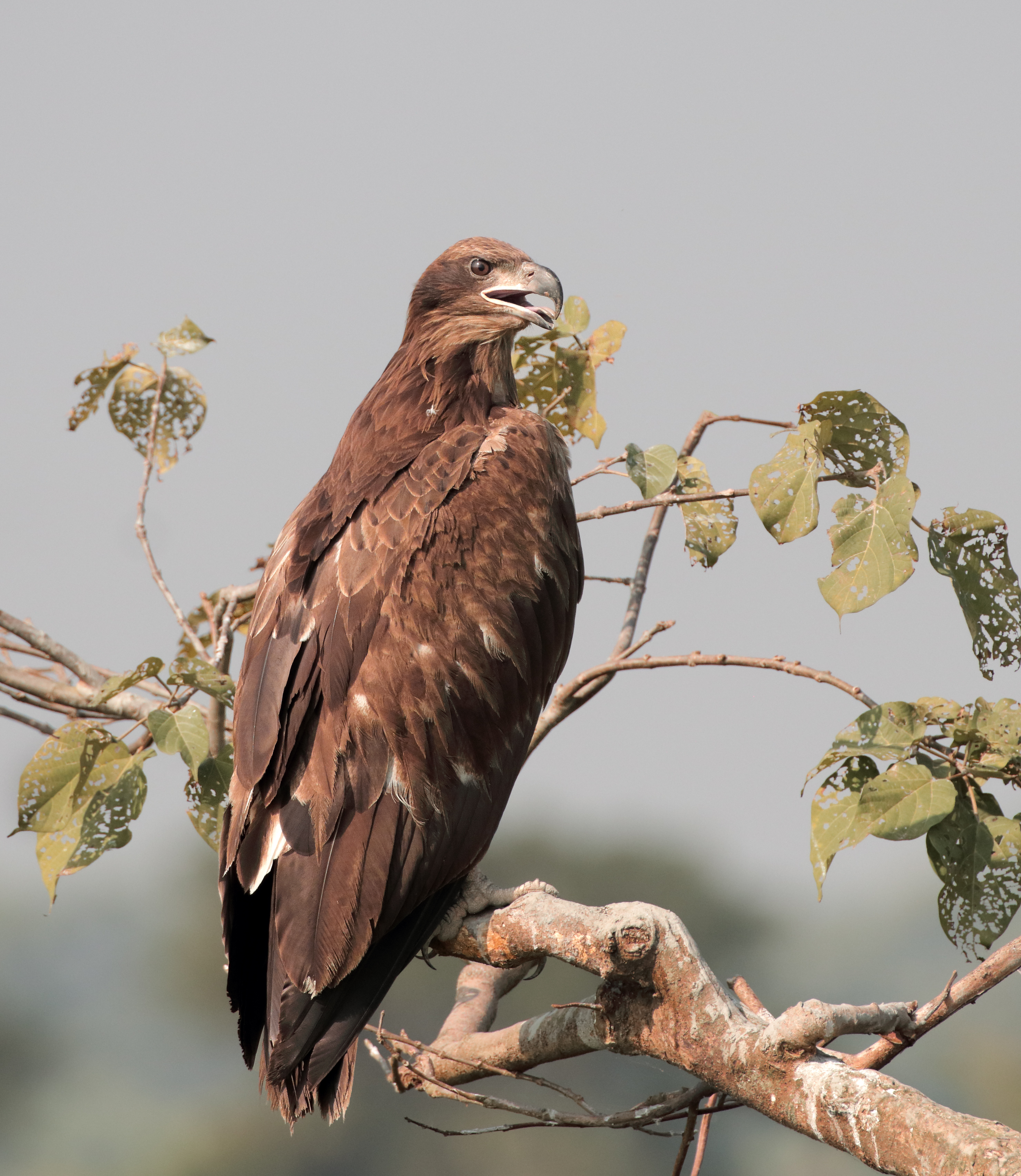
Juvenile Pallas's fish eagle in Bangladesh

The Pallas's fish eagle occurs in Russia, Turkmenistan, Uzbekistan, Tajikistan, Kazakhstan, Mongolia, China, India, Nepal, Bangladesh, Myanmar and Bhutan.

== Conservation ==
The Pallas's fish eagle is listed as Endangered on the IUCN Red List. The global population is estimated at less than 2,500 individuals. Besides direct persecution, humans contribute to the decline of this species through habitat degradation, pollution, and draining or overfishing lakes. In India, the spread of water hyacinth in lakes possibly makes finding prey difficult for the Pallas's fish eagle. Its large range is deceptive, as Pallas's fish eagle is rare and isolated throughout its territory and may not breed in large areas of it.
