= Fecampiida =

Scientific classification
- Kingdom: Animalia
- Phylum: Platyhelminthes
- Subphylum: Rhabditophora
- Order: Fecampiida; Rohde, Luton, Baverstock & Johnson, 1994

Families
- Fecampiidae; Genostomatidae; Notenteridae; Piscinquilinidae; Urastomidae

Order of flatworms

Fecampiida is an order of flatworms in the class Rhabditophora. It is a considerably recent clade, erected after molecular studies.

== Description ==
The order Fecampiida, as currently defined, was erected based on molecular studies. They all are parasitic organisms and are united by a similar development of the basal bodies during spermiogenesis.

== Classification ==
Three families of Fecampiida were initially classified in different flatworm orders: Urastomidae and Genostomatidae were considered prolecithophorans, while Fecampiidae was considered a rhabdocoel. When the genus Notentera was discovered, its relationship with Fecampiidae was clear based on morphology, and both groups were united under Fecampiida. Further ultrastructural studies suggested that Urastomidae and Genostomatidae were closely related to Fecampiidae and Notenteridae, which was confirmed by molecular studies.

Due to similarities in the protonephridial flame bulb, sperm and spermiogenesis, as well as the parasitic lifestyle, fecampiids were thought to be closely related to neodermatans, but molecular studies revealed them to be more closely related to triclads and prolecithophorans.
