= Seriata =

Scientific classification
- Kingdom: Animalia
- Phylum: Platyhelminthes
- Class: Turbellaria
- Order: Seriata; Breslau, 1928-33

Order of flatworms

The Seriata are an order of turbellarian flatworms.

They are found in both freshwater and marine environments, and also include a number of species found in damp terrestrial conditions. Most are free-living, but the group includes the genus Bdelloura, which lives comensally on the gills of horseshoe crabs. Seriatans are distinguished from other related groups by the presence of a folded pharynx and of a number of diverticula arising from the intestine. The intestine itself may be either simple or branched.
