= Urastoma =

Scientific classification
- Kingdom: Animalia
- Phylum: Platyhelminthes
- Order: Fecampiida
- Family: Urastomidae; Dörler, 1900
- Genus: Urastoma; Dörler, 1900
- Species: U. cyprinae

Binomial name
- Urastoma cyprinae (Graff, 1882)

Species of flatworm

Urastoma cyprinae is a turbellarian that infects the gills of numerous species. It is the only species in the genus Urastoma and family Urastomidae. It has been reported as free-living organism in marine mud and on algae. Urastoma cyprinae is reported as an opportunistic mantle inhabitant on the gills of various bivalve species, including the clams Tridacna maxima and Tridacna gigas, and the mussels Mytilus edulis and Mytilus galloprovincialis. They are also found throughout the gill surface of C. virginica and is attracted by mucus that coats the gills of oysters. However, the nature of the host-parasite relationship remains unknown.

== Morphology ==
Urastoma cyprinae is a ciliated turbellarian measuring between 0.4 and 0.8 mm in length.

== Life cycle ==
They live and feed and grow in the mussels, but their complete life cycle stumped researchers because eggs were never observed in these hosts. Researchers in Spain recently discovered that when U. cyprinae is ready to lay eggs, it leaves the bivalve, secretes a protective cocoon around itself and produces an egg sac. About 24 days later, the young hatch out (shown in the photo), make their way out of the cocoon and swim off to find new mussel hosts. The adults sometimes appear to just die in the cocoons, but sometimes also were observed to escape from it themselves and head off to lay more eggs.

== Prevention ==
There are no known methods of prevention or control.

== Pathogenicity ==
Urastoma cyprinae is believed to feed on the mucus secreted by its host and its presence alters the protease composition of gills in C. virginica. Urastoma cyprinae is negatively phototatic and is more attracted to oysters when compared to other mollusc species such as mussels and clams. Urastoma cyprinae attaches its anterior end to gill filaments, presumably in a feeding posture, and arches its body back and forth, wagging its posterior end, which bears the terminal orogenital pore, within the mucus that flows over the gills. Ingestion of foods is likely to be driven by the sphincters on the orogenital atrium. Urastoma cyprinae exhibits a marked seasonal pattern, with the highest levels of infection occurring during the summer and autumn, coinciding with the highest abundance of juvenile worms in the gills, and the lowest in winter.

Histological examinations revealed prokaryotic infections within the digestive gland of both mussel specimens and in the digestive tract of Urastoma cyprinaeis. In the worm Urastoma cyprinaeis, 2 types of microorganisms were observed within sub-segmentary cells, a Chlamydia-like organism (CLO) and a myco-plasma-like organism (MLO). The CLO found in Urastoma cyprinaeis is the first infectious agent described in this species. It exhibits some similarities with the Chlamydiales reported in marine invertebrates, but differs in the morphology of its elementary bodies. The second intracellular microorganism found in Urastoma cyprinae appears closely related to the Mollicutes.
