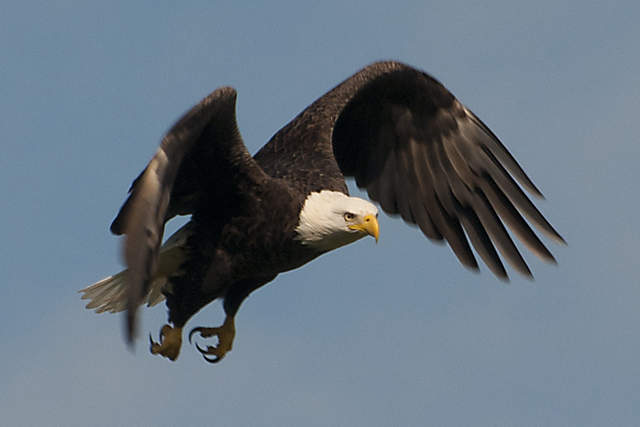
- Bald eagle (Haliaeetus leucocephalus)

Scientific classification
- Kingdom: Animalia
- Phylum: Chordata
- Class: Aves
- Order: Accipitriformes
- Family: Accipitridae
- Subfamily: Haliaeetinae; Savigny, 1809

Genera
- See text

= Sea eagle =

Sea eagle Temporal range: Middle Miocene–Recent 16–0 Ma

Genus of birds

A sea eagle or fish eagle (also called erne or ern, mostly in reference to the white-tailed eagle) is any of the birds of prey belonging to the subfamily Haliaeetinae of the bird of prey family Accipitridae. Ten extant species of sea eagles are known.

The subfamily has a significant "reach", with a scholarly article in 2005 reporting that they were "found in riverine and coastal habitat[s] throughout the world". However, Haliaeetinae inhabited areas have experienced particular threats given the context of human impacts on the environment.

== Taxonomy and evolution ==
The genus Haliaeetus was introduced in 1809 by French naturalist Marie Jules César Savigny in his chapter on birds in the Description de l'Égypte. In 2005, Haliaeetus was found to be paraphyletic after molecular study was performed; that genus was found to subsume Icthyophaga with the species within it diverging into temperate and tropical groups. Subsequently, the two species of Icthyophaga were accordingly moved within Haliaeetus, within the tropical group.

However, an academic paper published in 2024 based on a densely sampled molecular phylogenetic study of the Accipitridae by Therese Catanach and collaborators found Icthyophaga to be distinct enough to be their own genus from Haliaeetus. This resulted in Frank Gill, Pamela C. Rasmussen and David Donsker on behalf of the International Ornithological Committee (IOC) resurrecting Icthyophaga, and also moving the more tropical members of Haliaeetus into a now-expanded Icthyophaga.

=== Species ===
Image	Genus	Living species
	Haliaeetus Savigny, 1809	Bald eagle, Haliaeetus leucocephalus – most of Canada and Alaska, all of the contiguous United States, and northern Mexico; Pallas's fish eagle, Haliaeetus leucoryphus – Kazakhstan, Russia, Tajikistan, Turkmenistan, Uzbekistan, Mongolia, China, India, Nepal, Bangladesh, Myanmar and Bhutan; White-tailed eagle, Haliaeetus albicilla – Greenland and Iceland across Eurasia to as far east as Hokkaido, Japan; Steller's sea eagle, Haliaeetus pelagicus – Russia, Korea, Japan, China, and Taiwan
	Icthyophaga (Lesson, 1843)	White-bellied sea eagle, Icthyophaga leucogaster – India and Sri Lanka through Southeast Asia to Australia; Sanford's sea eagle, Icthyophaga sanfordi – Solomon Islands; African fish eagle, Icthyophaga vocifer – Sub-Saharan Africa; Madagascar fish eagle, Icthyophaga vociferoides – Madagascar; Lesser fish eagle, Icthyophaga humilis – Kashmir through southeast India, Nepal, and Burma towards Indochina; Grey-headed fish eagle, Icthyophaga ichthyaetus – Southeast Asia

=== Evolution ===
Haliaeetus is possibly one of the oldest genera of living birds, remaining extant until today. A distal left tarsometatarsus (DPC 1652) recovered from early Oligocene deposits of Fayyum, Egypt (Jebel Qatrani Formation, about 33 million years ago (Mya)) is similar in general pattern and some details to that of a modern sea eagle. The genus was present in the middle Miocene (12–16 Mya) with certainty.

The point of origin of the sea- and fishing eagles is probably in the general area of the Bay of Bengal. During the Eocene/Oligocene, as the Indian subcontinent slowly collided with Eurasia, the region was a vast expanse of fairly shallow ocean; the initial sea eagle divergence seems to have resulted in the four tropical (and Southern Hemisphere subtropical) species living around the Indian Ocean today. The Central Asian Pallas's sea eagle's relationships to the other taxa is more obscure; it seems closer to the three Holarctic species which evolved later and may be an early offshoot of this northward expansion; it does not have the hefty yellow bill of the northern forms, retaining a smaller, darker beak like the tropical species.

A prehistoric (i.e. extinct before 1500) form from Maui in the Hawaiian Islands may represent a species or subspecies within this clade.

The rate of molecular evolution in Haliaeetus is fairly slow, as is to be expected in long-lived birds which take years to successfully reproduce. In the mtDNA cytochrome b gene, a mutation rate of 0.5–0.7% per million years (if assuming an Early Miocene divergence) or maybe as little as 0.25–0.3% per million years (for a Late Eocene divergence) has been shown.

The relationships to other genera in the family Accipitridae are less clear; they have long been considered closer to the genus Milvus (kites) than to the true eagles in the genus Aquila on the basis of their morphology and display behaviour; more recent genetic evidence agrees with this, but points to their being related to the genus Buteo (buzzards/hawks), as well, a relationship not previously thought close.

== Description ==
Sea eagles vary in size, from Sanford's sea eagle, averaging 2–2.7 kilograms (4.4–6.0 lb), to Steller's sea eagle, weighing up to 9 kg (20 lb). At up to 6.9 kg (15 lb 3 oz), the white-tailed eagle is the largest eagle in Europe. Bald eagles can weigh up to 6.3 kg (13 lb 14 oz), making them the largest eagle native to North America. There are exceptional records of even heavier individuals in both the white-tailed and bald eagles, although not surpassing the largest Steller's sea eagles. The white-bellied sea eagle can weigh up to 4.5 kg (9 lb 15 oz). They are generally overall brown (from rich brown to dull grey-brown), often with white to the head, tail or underparts. Some of the species have an all-yellow beak as adults, which is unusual among eagles. The tail is entirely white in adult Haliaeetus species except for Sanford's, white-bellied, and Pallas's. Three species pairs exist: white-tailed and bald eagles, Sanford's and white-bellied sea eagles, and the African and Madagascar fish eagles, each of these consists of a white- and a tan-headed species.

Their diets consist mainly of fish, aquatic birds, and small mammals. Nests are typically very large and positioned in a tree, but sometimes on a cliff.

== Relation to humans ==
A sea eagle in the flag of Naval Reconnaissance Battalion of Finnish Navy

- The bald eagle is the national symbol of the United States.
- The silver eagle on red shield on the arms of Poland has been interpreted as the sea eagle.
- Namibia, Zambia, and Zimbabwe have the African fish eagle as their national bird.
- The white-tailed eagle is the national bird of Poland.
- The Manly Warringah Sea Eagles are an Australian professional rugby league club that competes in the National Rugby League (NRL).
- Nesting pairs of both the bald eagle and white-bellied sea eagle have been subject to live-streaming webcam footage.
- In heraldic language, the osprey is termed a "sea-eagle", although ospreys come from the taxonomic family Pandionidae and are not classified as true sea eagles.
- Novelist Kurt Vonnegut invented the extinct "Bermuda ern" as a literary device in his novel Breakfast of Champions.

=== Conservation ===
The Haliaeetinae subfamily is an especially threatened collection of creatures within the broader Accipitridae species, according to the academic journal Molecular Phylogenetics and Evolution, given the "anthropogenic factors" involved. The publication reported in 2005 that prior trends had meant that sea eagles could be "found in riverine and coastal habitat[s] throughout the world". In terms of international scientific campaigns, the Convention on International Trade in Endangered Species (CITES) protects all entities in the broader species, including sea eagles.

== See also ==
- Brahminy kite, also called "red-backed sea eagle"
- Osprey, also called "sea hawk"
