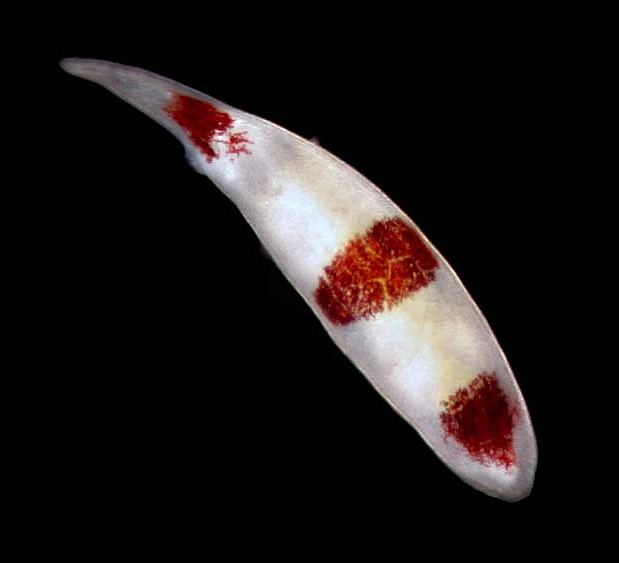
- Plagiostomum vittatum

Scientific classification
- Kingdom: Animalia
- Phylum: Platyhelminthes
- Order: Prolecithophora
- Family: Plagiostomidae

Genera
- See text.

= Plagiostomidae =

Family of flatworms

Plagiostomidae is a family of marine, free-living flatworms in the order Prolecithophora.

== Description ==
Species of Plagiostomidae have an oblong body with the mouth at the anterior end and the gonopore near or at the posterior end. They typically have one or two pairs of eyes and lack a brain capsule and a ciliated groove around the anterior end of the body.

== Genera ==
Nine genera are currently considered in Plagiostomidae. However, at least one genus, Plagiostomum, is paraphyletic.

- Acmostomum Schmarda, 1859
- Auriculifera Kulinitch, 1973
- Hydrolimax Haldeman, 1842
- Plagiostomum Schmidt, 1852
- Plicastoma von Graff, 1904
- Puzostoma Marcus, 1950
- Torgea Jondelius, 1951
- Tuilica Marcus, 1951
- Vorticeros Schmidt, 1852
