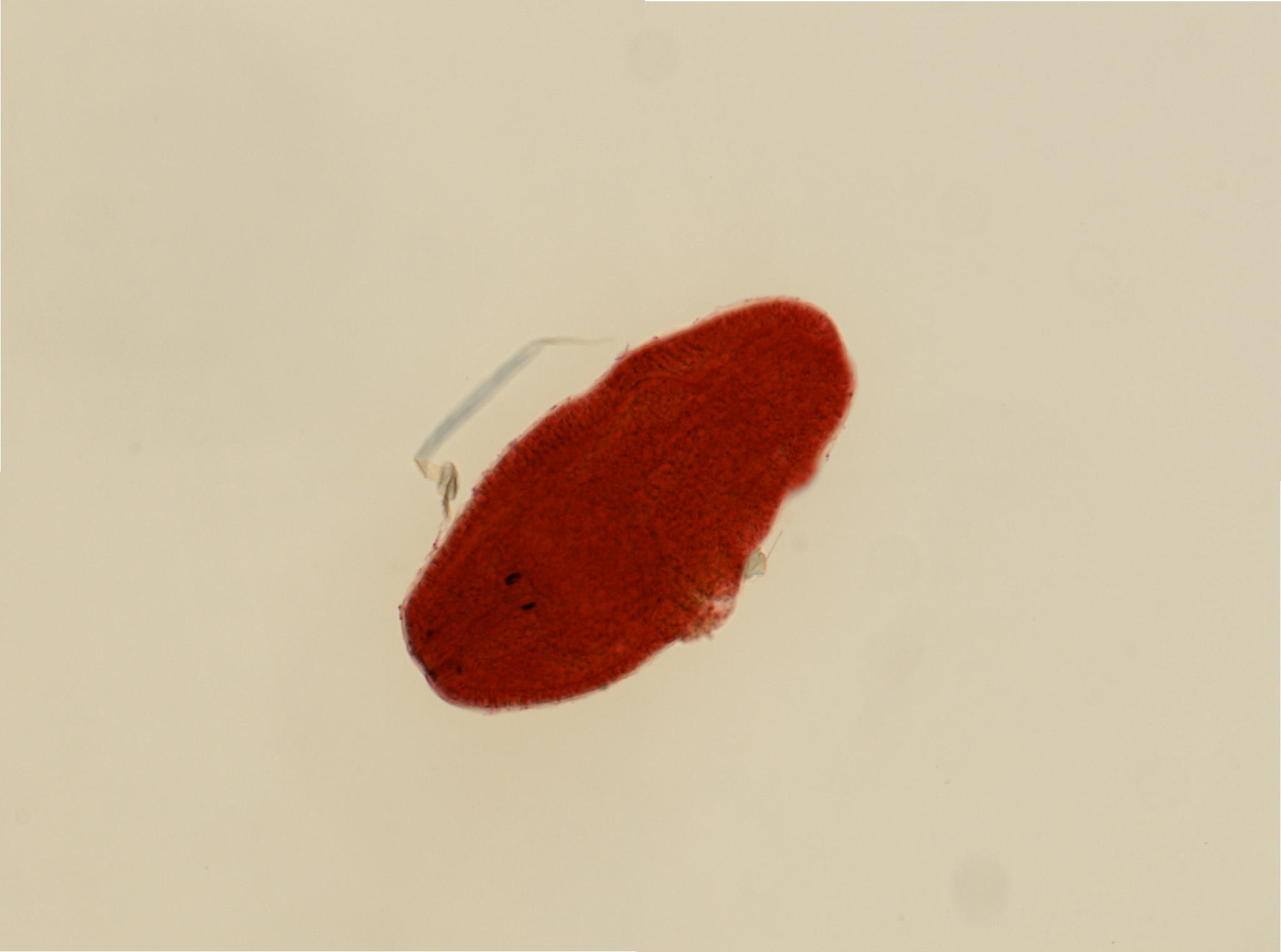
- Pseudostomum quadrioculatum

Scientific classification
- Kingdom: Animalia
- Phylum: Platyhelminthes
- Order: Prolecithophora
- Family: Pseudostomidae
- Genus: Pseudostomum; Schmidt, 1848

Species
- See text

Synonyms
- Rusalka Uljanin, 1870

= Pseudostomum =

Genus of flatworms

Pseudostomum is a genus of flatworms in the family Pseudostomidae.

== Species ==
The following species are recognised:

- Pseudostomum arenarium Meixner, 1938
- Pseudostomum californicum Karling, 1962
- Pseudostomum coecum (Graff, 1882)
- Pseudostomum gracilis Westblad, 1955
- Pseudostomum klostermanni (Graff, 1874)
- Pseudostomum quadrioculatum (Leuckart, 1847)
