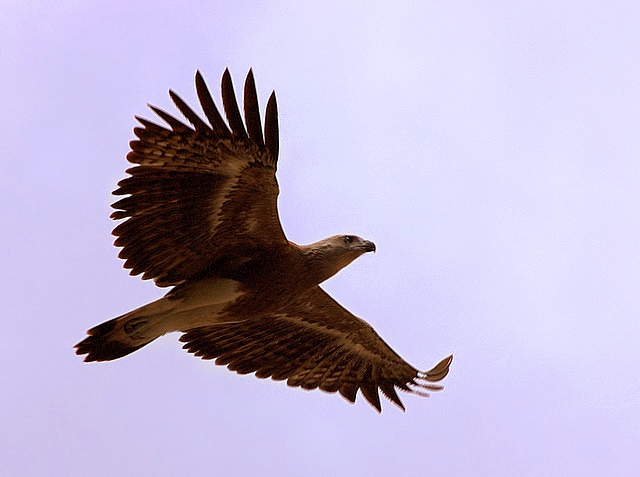

Conservation status
- Near Threatened (IUCN 3.1)
- CITES Appendix II

Scientific classification
- Kingdom: Animalia
- Phylum: Chordata
- Class: Aves
- Order: Accipitriformes
- Family: Accipitridae
- Genus: Icthyophaga
- Species: I. humilis

Binomial name
- Icthyophaga humilis (Müller & Schlegel, 1841)

Subspecies
- I. h. plumbeus - (Jerdon, 1871); I. h. humilis - (Müller, S & Schlegel, 1841)

Synonyms
- Ichthyophaga humilis

= Lesser fish eagle =

Species of bird

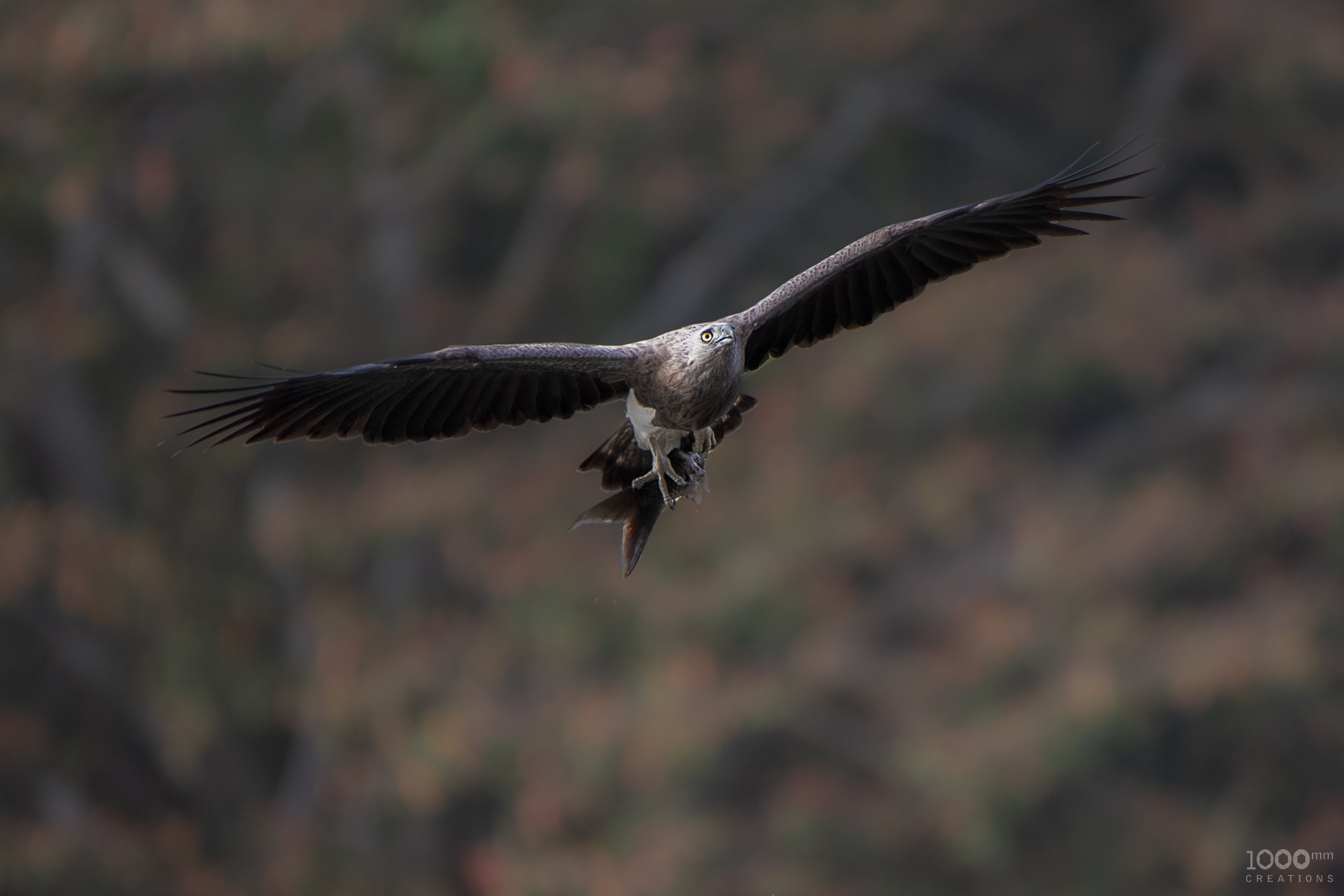
the lesser fish eagle with fish kill

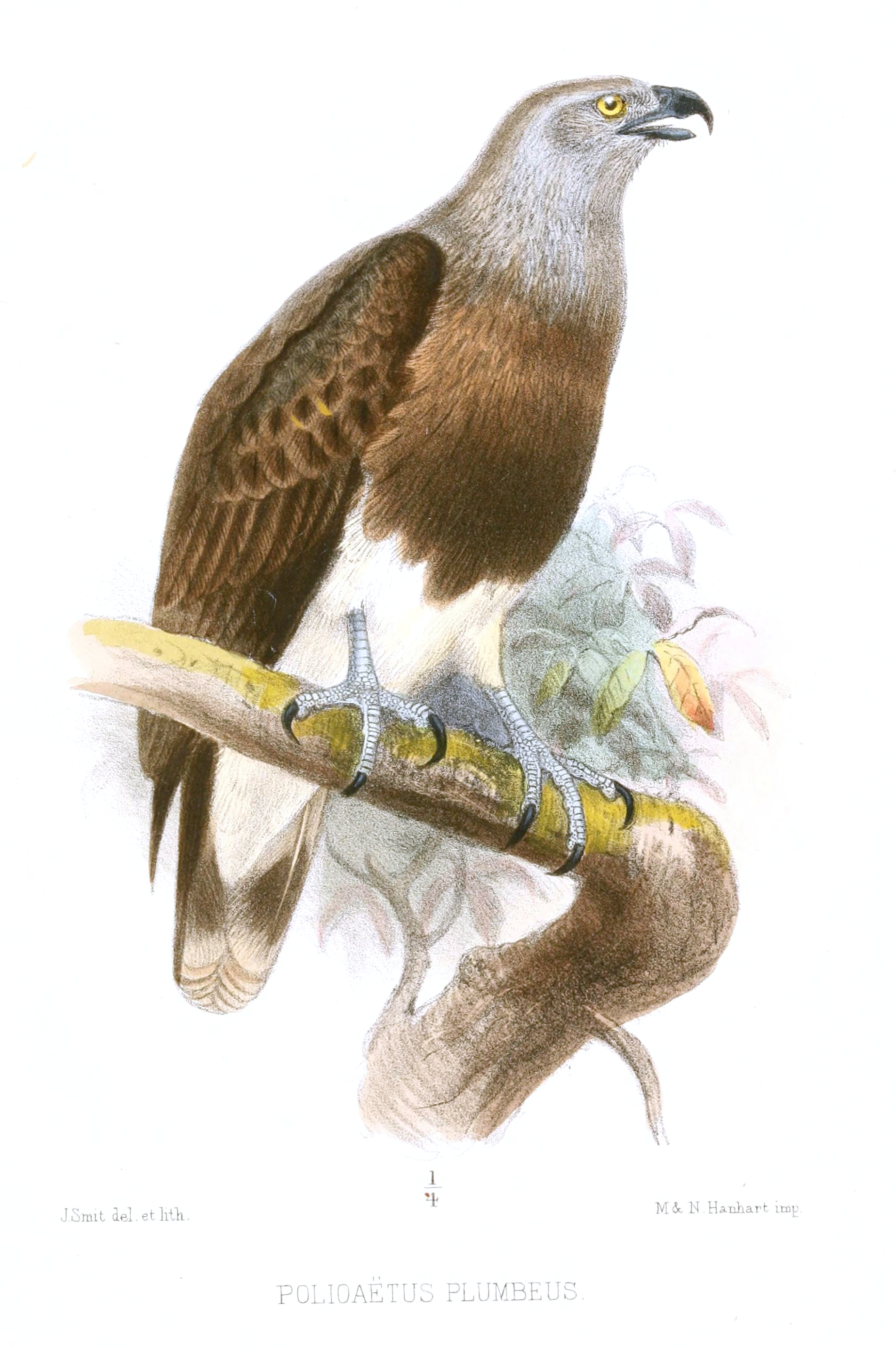

The lesser fish eagle (Icthyophaga humilis) is a species of Icthyophaga found in the Indian subcontinent, primarily in the foothills of the Himalayas, and south-east Asia. There are records from Gujarat, Central India and in more recent times from the Kaveri river valley in southern India, although the south Indian records are now thought to come from an isolated population, disjunct from the species' normal range. Some taxonomic authorities place this species in the genus Icthyophaga. Others place it in the genus Haliaeetus.

Lesser fish eagles are fish-eating birds that have feet adapted to aid in gripping slippery fish. They have strongly curved talons, and spicules along the underside of the birds' toes help to grip fish as they pull them from the water.

There are two subspecies: Icthyophaga humilis humilis, which is native to the Malaysian Peninsula, Sumatra, Borneo, and Sulawesi; and Icthyophaga humilis plumbeus, which is native to Kashmir through southeast India, Nepal, and Burma towards Indochina.

== Description ==
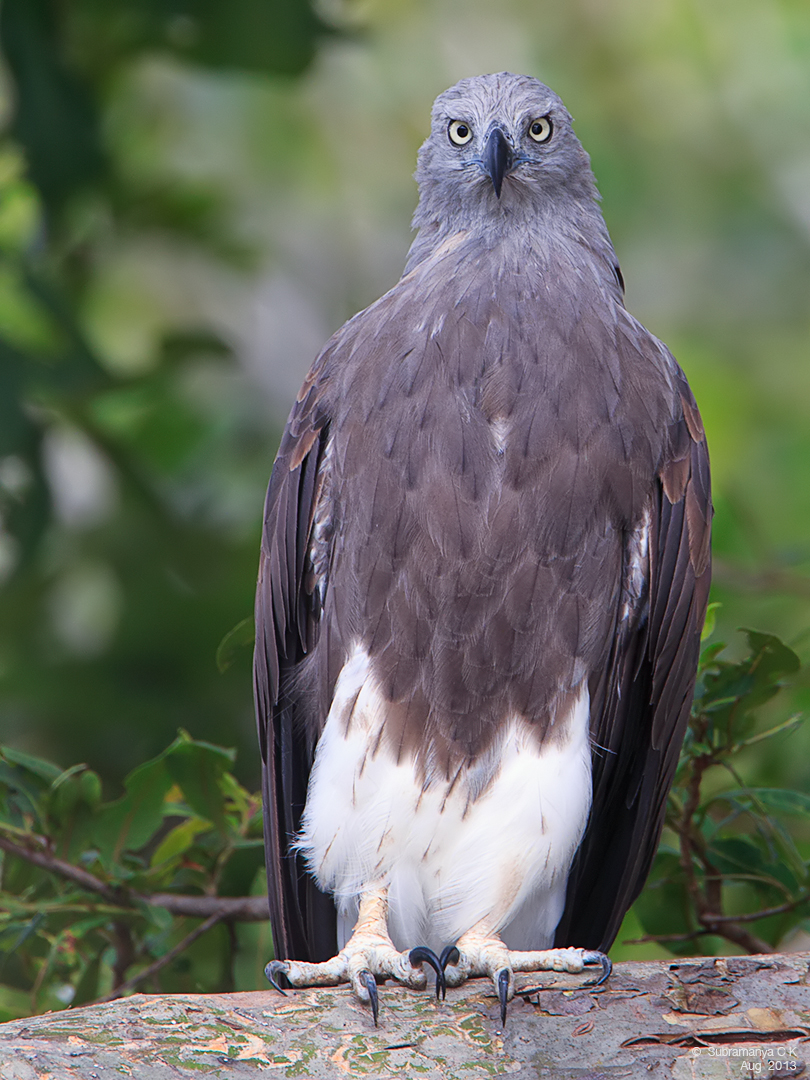
Lesser fish eagle on the banks of river Kaveri, India

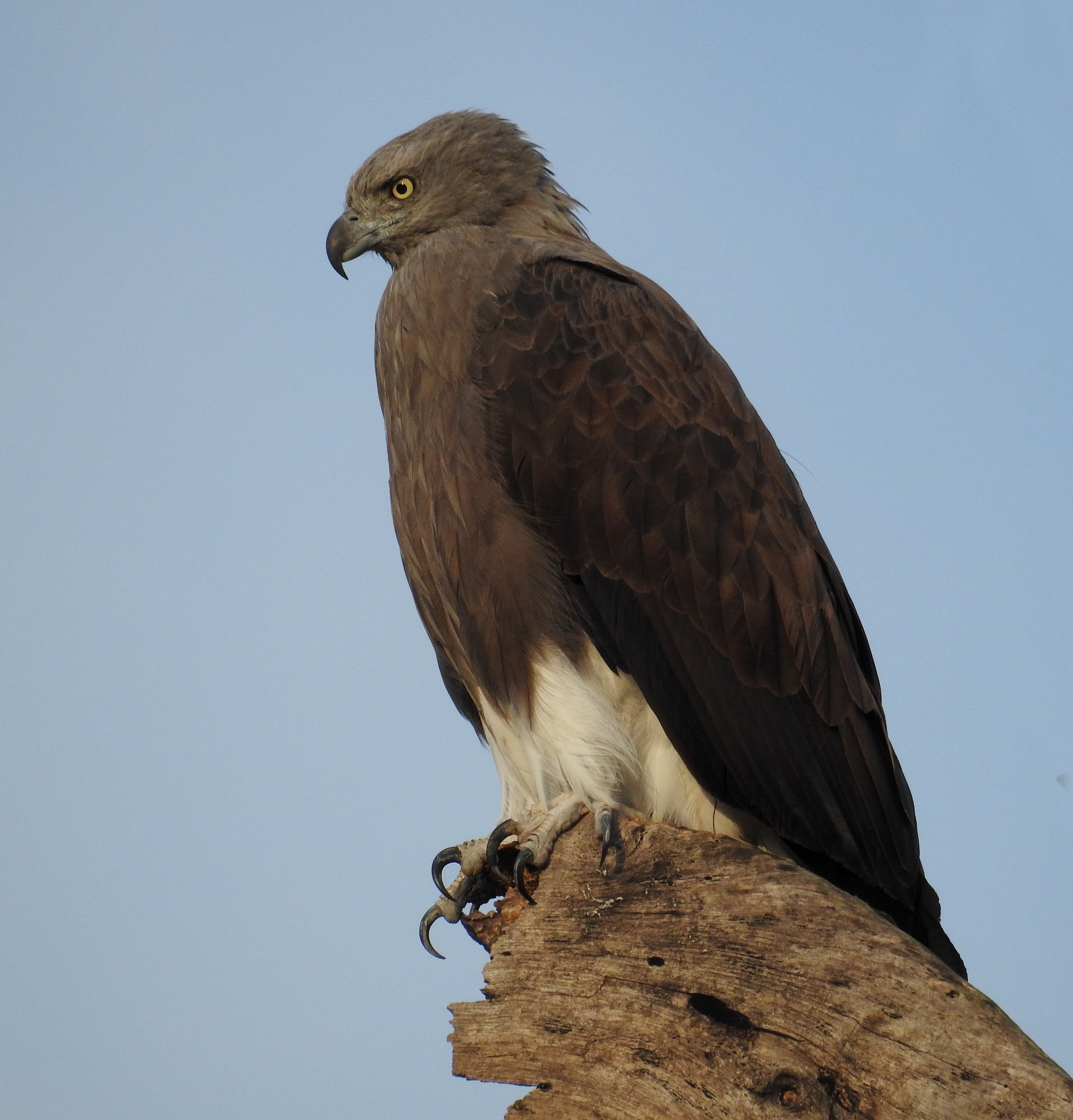
at Jim Corbett National Park

The lesser fish eagle is a medium-sized bird of prey that is primarily gray-brown in colour with broad, blunt wings and coarse featherless legs. They are smaller than the similar Icthyophaga ichthyaetus (grey-headed fish eagle) and may often get confused with the similar species. The lesser fish eagle has a brown breast with white thighs and belly. They have a short, rounded tail with a long neck and a small head. Juvenile lesser fish eagles are similar in appearance to adults, although they have brown eyes whereas an adult has yellow. Adults have a wingspan reaching 1.2 m (3 ft 11 in) and can grow to up to 64 centimetres (25 in) tall.

== Diet and feeding habits ==
The lesser fish eagle feeds primarily on fish, which it snatches from the water as it observes them from above on a perch, which may be an overhanging tree or rock in the middle of a stream. They have several personal perches that they often switch between throughout their feeding time. As their diet is primarily fish, lesser fish eagles have large, curved talons specialized for catching fish and taking them from the water.

== Habitat ==
They inhabit various forms of rivers, lakes, and wetlands and are seen most often along hill streams and fast moving water. They have been known to reach heights up to 2,400 m, but usually create their habitats below 1,000 m (3,280 ft). Some specific eagles have been recorded to reach heights exceeding 4,000 m (13,120 ft) in Nepal.

== Range ==
The lesser fish eagle has been known to live in India and the Kashmir region, spanning eastward into Nepal, China, and other parts of Southeast Asia. In India, they are restricted to the Himalayan foothills and move north-eastern. Adults move south of the Himalayan mountain ranges, but remain partial and altitudinal in the Himalayas throughout the year. They have been known to live in a variety of widespread locations such as Bangladesh and Nepal, to Cambodia, Indonesia, and Vietnam. Researchers believe that there are 1,000 to 10,000 individuals. The numbers of the lesser fish eagle are in decline for various reasons such as habitat loss, human disturbance, as well as hunting and nest robbery. They have recently been listed as Near Threatened by BirdLife International.

== Reproduction ==
Although incubation and fledging periods are unknown, the breeding season in the lesser fish eagle begins in March and ends in August for those in Northern India and Nepal, but in other areas, may begin in November and end in April. Roughly 2-4 eggs are laid in a clutch, and their nests consist of sticks and green leaves. After enough use, the nest may reach 1 m across and up to 1.5 m deep.
