= Multipeniata =

Scientific classification
- Kingdom: Animalia
- Phylum: Platyhelminthes
- Order: Prolecithophora
- Family: Multipeniatidae; Karling, 1940
- Genus: Multipeniata; Nasonov, 1927

Genus of flatworms

Multipeniata is a genus of flatworms in the order Prolecithophora. It is the only genus in the monotypic family Multipeniatidae.

== Species ==
The following species are recognised in the genus Multipeniata:

- Multipeniata batalansae Nasonov, 1927
- Multipeniata birmanse (Westblad, 1956)
- Multipeniata californica Karling & Jondelius, 1995
- Multipeniata kho Nasonov, 1927
