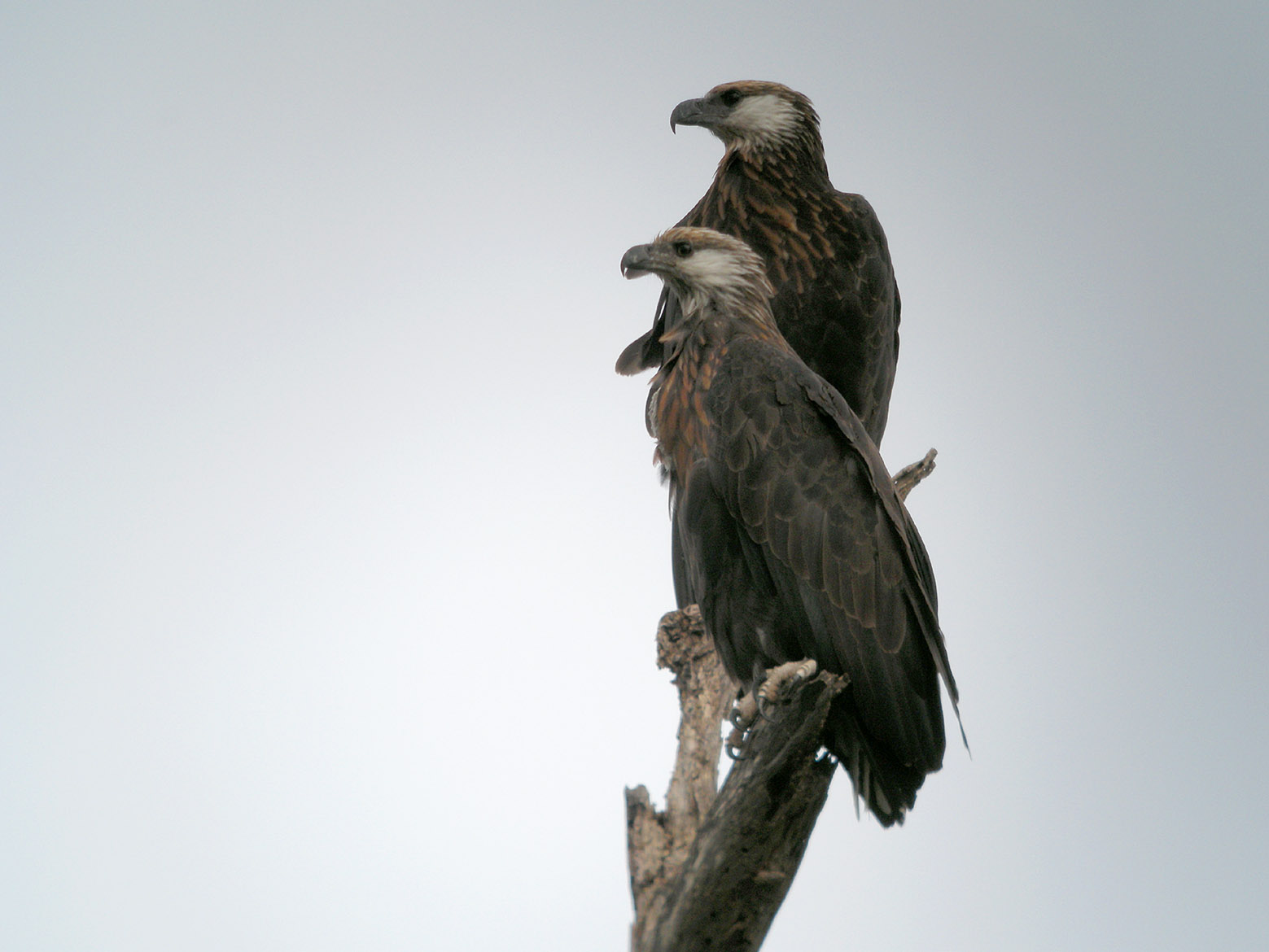
- Two at Lake Ravelobe, Ankarafantsika National Park

Conservation status
- Critically Endangered (IUCN 3.1)
- CITES Appendix II

Scientific classification
- Kingdom: Animalia
- Phylum: Chordata
- Class: Aves
- Order: Accipitriformes
- Family: Accipitridae
- Genus: Icthyophaga
- Species: I. vociferoides

Binomial name
- Icthyophaga vociferoides (Des Murs, 1845)
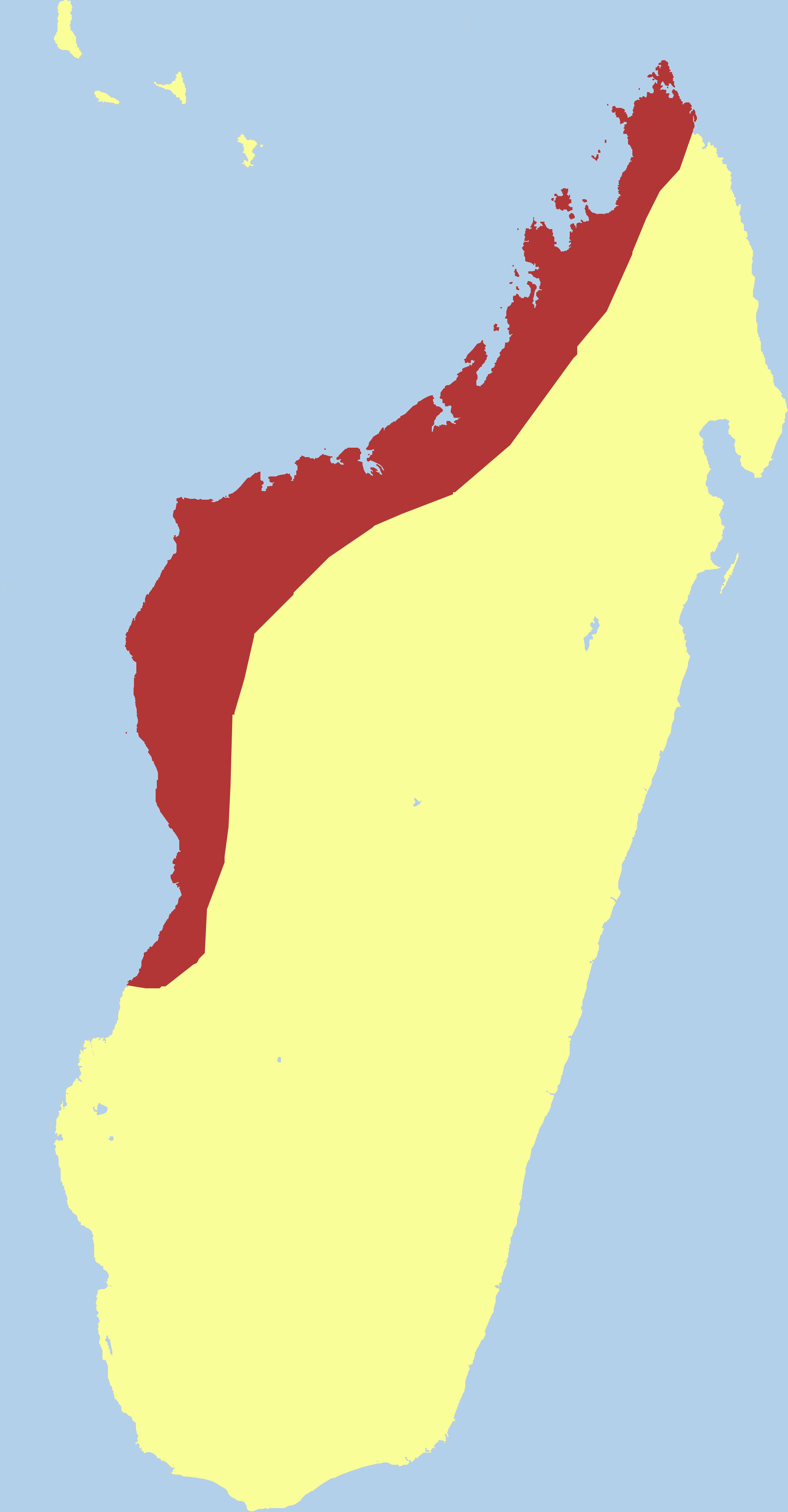
- native range

= Madagascar fish eagle =

Species of bird

The Madagascar fish eagle (Icthyophaga vociferoides) or Madagascar sea-eagle (to distinguish it from the Icthyophaga fishing-eagles), is a large bird of prey in the family Accipitridae which also includes many other diurnal raptors such as kites, buzzards and harriers. It is endemic to the coastal strip in the northwest of Madagascar. It is about 63 cm (25 in) long and has a pale brown head, dark brown body and white tail. The Madagascar fish eagle has been suffering from a declining population and is threatened by habitat destruction and persecution, and the International Union for Conservation of Nature has rated its conservation status as being "critically endangered".

== Description ==
The Madagascar fish eagle is a medium-sized sea eagle, 60–66 cm (23.5–26 in) long and with a wingspan of 165–180 cm (65–71 in). The body and wings are dark brown, with a pale brown head and a white tail; the bill is blackish with a paler base, and the legs are pale grey. Males weigh 2.2–2.6 kg (4.9–5.7 lb), while the slightly larger females weigh 2.8–3.5 kg (6.2–7.7 lb).

Its closest relative is the African fish eagle, Icthyophaga vocifer. Together, they form a distinct species pair lineage of sea-eagles, which separated soon after the divergence of the genus; they retain the ancestral dark beak, talon, and eye, but unlike Haliaeetus species, they always have at least partially white tails, even while juvenile. As in other sea-eagle species pairs, one species (the Madagascan fish eagle in this case) has a tan head, while the other has a white one.

The Madagascar Fish Eagle is also known to exhibit polyandrous breeding behavior, where a single female mates with two males. A study conducted in the Tsimembo-Manambolomaty Protected Area recorded multiple polyandrous pairs, which showed higher reproductive success compared to monogamous pairs (Razafimanjato et al., 2018).

== Distribution ==
This species is endemic to Madagascar, where it survives in low numbers along the northwest coast north of Morondava. The range of this eagle is within the Madagascar dry deciduous forests. The principal locus of population according to the United Nations Environmental Programme is in the Analova region; 20 to 25 breeding pairs were there as of the 1980s. A more recent survey by Garbutt and Hogan report a smaller concentration of at least three breeding pairs in the Anjajavy Forest along the Indian Ocean, where several streams discharge north of Anjajavy Village.

== Status ==
Total population estimates from the United Nations and from Grambo place the world population of this species at about 40 breeding pairs; according to Grambo this bird may be one of the rarest birds on Earth. Surveys between 2005 and 2006 recorded at least 240 adults (287 total individuals), with an estimated 120 breeding pairs.

The main threats to its breeding habitat are deforestation, soil erosion and the development of wetland areas for rice paddies. It is also in direct competition with humans for fish stocks. Because of its decline in numbers and the threats it faces, the International Union for Conservation of Nature has assessed the bird's conservation status as being "critically endangered".

== Gallery ==
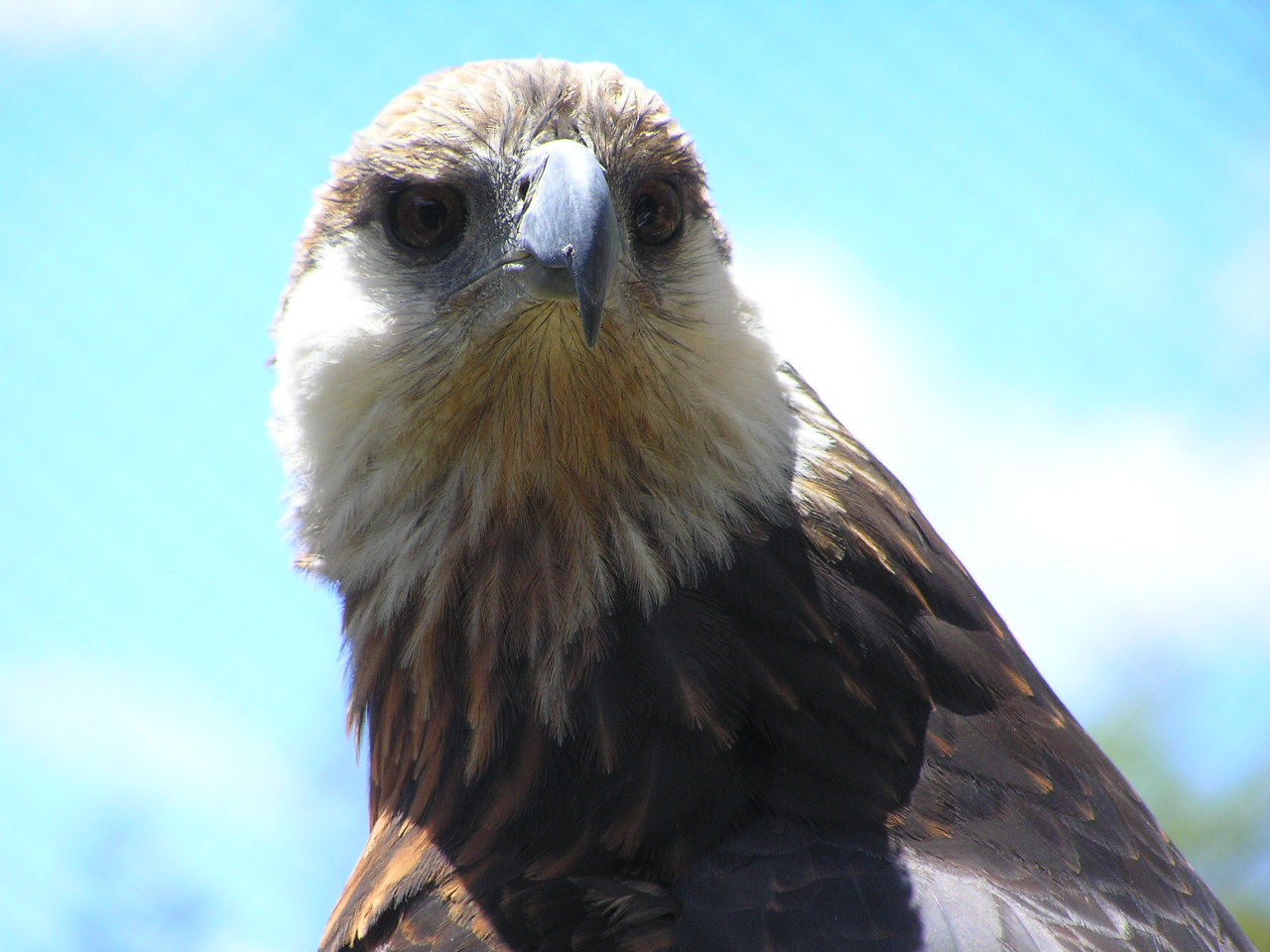
At Tsimbazaza Zoo, Antananarivo

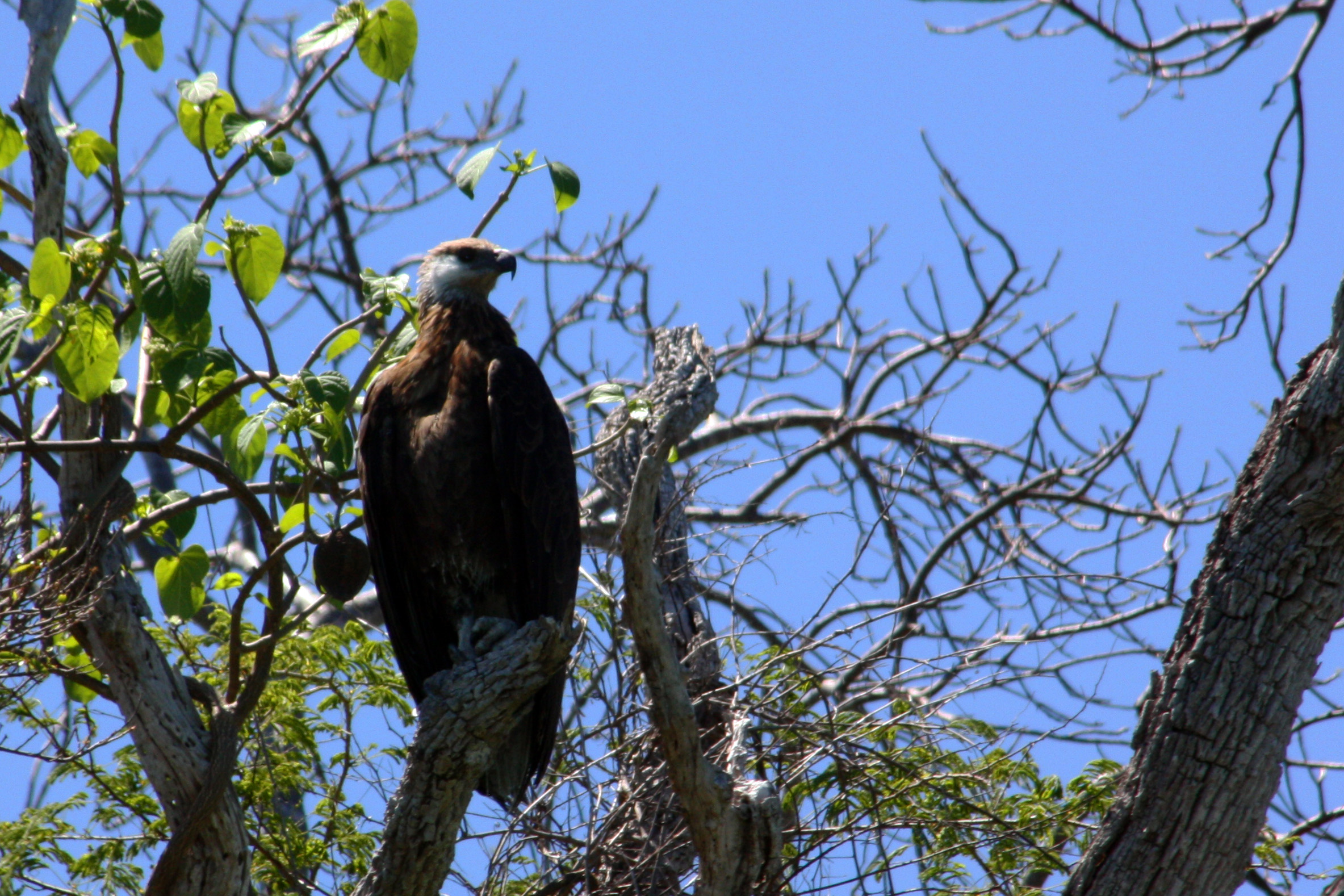
Haliaeetus vociferoides in the Anjajavy Forest

== Footnotes ==
- "Madagascar Fish Eagle (Haliaeetus vociferoides) — BirdLife species factsheet". BirdLife.org. BirdLife International.

Cited works

- del Hoyo, J.; Elliott, A.; Sargatal, J., eds. (1994). Handbook of the Birds of the World. Vol. 2. Barcelona: Lynx Edicions. ISBN 84-87334-15-6.
