= Cylindrostoma =

Scientific classification
- Kingdom: Animalia
- Phylum: Platyhelminthes
- Order: Prolecithophora
- Family: Cylindrostomidae
- Genus: Cylindrostoma; Ørsted, 1845

Species
- Cylindrostoma cyprinae; Cylindrostoma monotrochum; Cylindrostoma triangulum; Cylindrostoma triste

Genus of flatworms

Cylindrostoma is a genus of flatworms in the family Cylindrostomidae.
