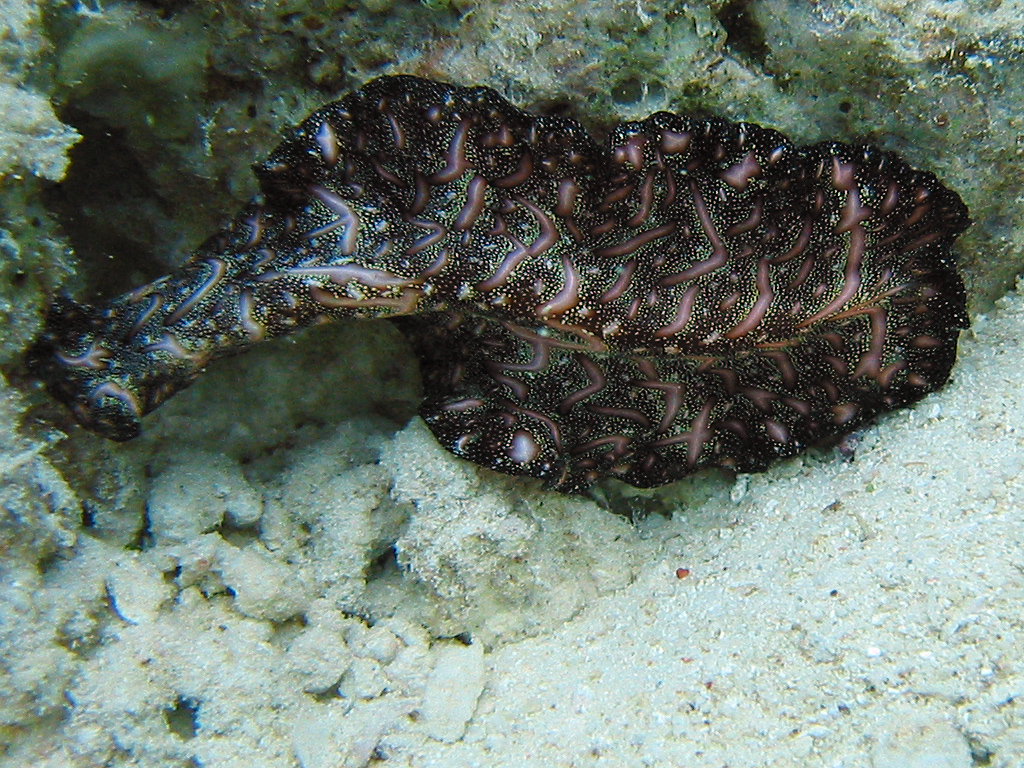
- A marine species Pseudobiceros bedfordi (Bedford's Flatworm), a member of the Polycladida

Scientific classification
- Kingdom: Animalia
- Phylum: Platyhelminthes
- Class: Turbellaria; Ehrenberg, 1831

Subgroups
- See text.

Cladistically included but traditionally excluded taxa
- Neodermata

= Turbellaria =

Turbellaria Temporal range: Middle Triassic–0 Possible Ordovician record

Class of flatworms

The Turbellaria are one of the traditional sub-divisions of the phylum Platyhelminthes (flatworms), and include all the sub-groups that are not exclusively parasitic. There are about 4,500 species, which range from 1 mm (0.039 in) to large freshwater forms more than 500 mm (20 in) long or terrestrial species like Bipalium kewense which can reach 600 mm (24 in) in length. All the larger forms are flat with ribbon-like or leaf-like shapes, since their lack of respiratory and circulatory systems means that they have to rely on diffusion for internal transport of metabolites. However, many of the smaller forms are round in cross section. Most are predators, and all live in water or in moist terrestrial environments. Most forms reproduce sexually and with few exceptions all are simultaneous hermaphrodites.

The Acoelomorpha and the genus Xenoturbella were formerly included in the Turbellaria, but are no longer regarded as Platyhelminthes. All the exclusively parasitic Platyhelminthes form a monophyletic group Neodermata, and it is agreed that these are descended from one small sub-group within the free-living Platyhelminthes. Hence the "Turbellaria" as traditionally defined are paraphyletic.

== Description ==
Traditional classifications divide the Platyhelminthes into four groups: Turbellaria and the wholly parasitic Trematoda, Monogenea and Cestoda. In this classification the Turbellaria include the Acoelomorpha (Acoela and Nemertodermatida). The name "Turbellaria" refers to the "whirlpools" of microscopic particles created close to the skins of aquatic species by the movement of their cilia.

=== Features common to all Platyhelminthes ===
As bilaterians, platyhelminthes are triploblastic, but have no internal body cavity (are acoelomate), and lack specialized circulatory and respiratory organs, so gas exchange is by simple diffusion. This limits the thickness of the body, so they are either microscopic or are flat and ribbon- or leaf-shaped, and vulnerable to fluid loss. The body is filled with mesenchyme, a connective tissue that can regenerate injured tissues and permits asexual reproduction. The nervous system is concentrated at the head end.

=== Features specific to Turbellaria ===
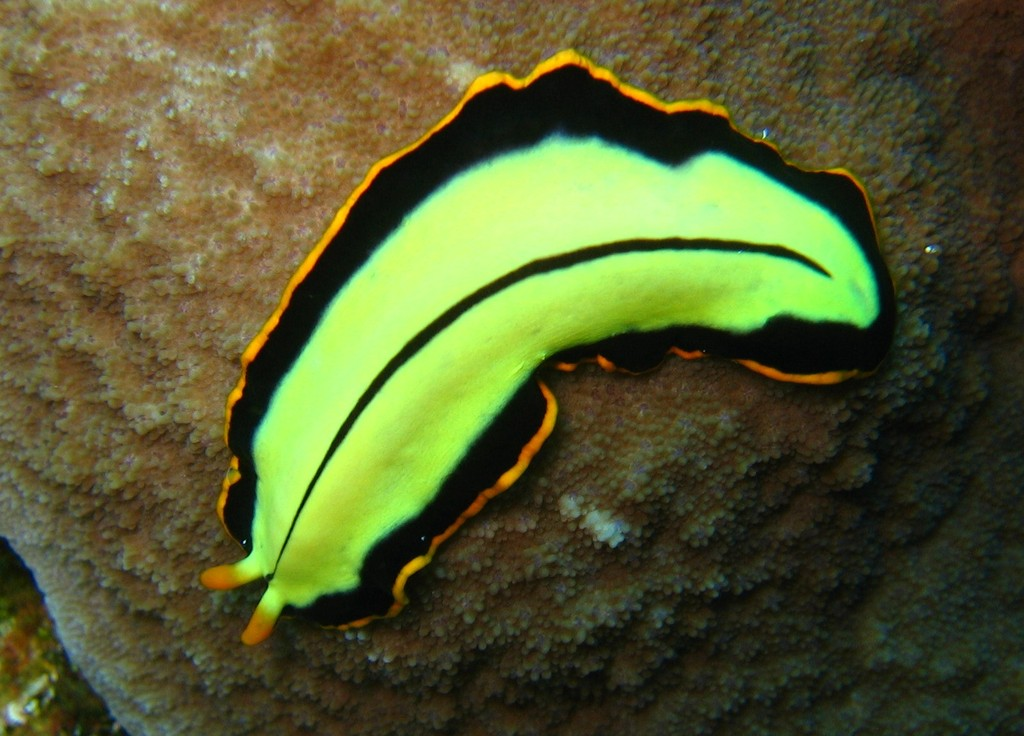
The turbellarian Pseudoceros dimidiatus

These have about 4,500 species, are mostly free-living, and range from 1 mm (0.039 in) to 600 mm (24 in) in length. Most are predators or scavengers, and terrestrial species are mostly nocturnal and live in shaded humid locations such as leaf litter or rotting wood. However some are symbiotes of other animals such as crustaceans, and some are parasites. Free-living turbellarians are mostly black, brown or gray, but some larger ones are brightly colored.

Turbellarians have no cuticle (external layer of organic but non-cellular material). In a few species the skin is a syncitium, a collection of cells with multiple nuclei and a single shared external membrane. However the skins of most species consist of a single layer of cells, each of which generally has multiple cilia (small mobile "hairs"), although in some large species the upper surface has no cilia. These skins are also covered with microvilli between the cilia. They have many glands, usually submerged in the muscle layers below the skin and connect to the surface by pores through which they secrete mucus, adhesives and other substances.

Small aquatic species use the cilia for locomotion, while larger ones use muscular movements of the whole body or of a specialized sole to creep or swim. Some are capable of burrowing, anchoring their rear ends at the bottom of the burrow, then stretching the head up to feed and then pulling it back down for safety. Some terrestrial species throw a thread of mucus which they use as a rope to climb from one leaf to another.

Some Turbellaria have spicular skeletons, giving the appearance of annulations.

=== Diet and digestion ===
Most other turbellarians are carnivorous, either preying on small invertebrates or protozoans, or scavenging on dead animals. A few feed on larger animals, including oysters and barnacles, while some, such as Bdelloura, are commensal on the gills of horseshoe crabs. These turbellarians usually have an eversible pharynx, in other words, one that can be extended by being turned inside-out, and the mouths of different species can be anywhere along the underside. The freshwater species Microstomum caudatum can open its mouth almost as wide as its body is long, to swallow prey as large as itself.

The intestine is lined by phagocytic cells which capture food particles that have already been partially digested by enzymes in the gut. Digestion is then completed within the phagocytic cells and the nutrients diffuse through the body.

=== Nervous system ===
Concentration of nervous tissue in the head region is least marked in the acoels, which have nerve nets rather like those of cnidarians and ctenophores, but densest around the head. In turbellarians, a distinct brain is present, albeit relatively simple in structure. From the brain one to four pairs of nerve cords run along the length the body, with numerous smaller nerves branching off. The ventral pair of nerve cords are typically the largest, and, in many species, are the only ones present. Unlike more complex animals, such as annelids, there are no ganglia on the nerve cords, other than those forming the brain.

Most turbellarians have pigment-cup ocelli ("little eyes"), one pair in most species, but two or even three pairs in some. A few large species have many eyes in clusters over the brain, mounted on tentacles, or spaced uniformly round the edge of the body. The ocelli can only distinguish the direction from which light is coming and enable the animals to avoid it.

A few groups – mainly catenulids and seriates – have statocysts, fluid-filled chambers containing a small solid particle or, in a few groups, two. These statocysts are thought to be balance and acceleration sensors, as that is the function they perform in cnidarian medusae and in ctenophores. However turbellarian statocysts have no sensory cilia, and it is unknown how they sense the movements and positions of the solid particles.

Most species have ciliated touch-sensor cells scattered over their bodies, especially on tentacles and around the edges. Specialized cells in pits or grooves on the head are probably smell-sensors.

=== Reproduction ===
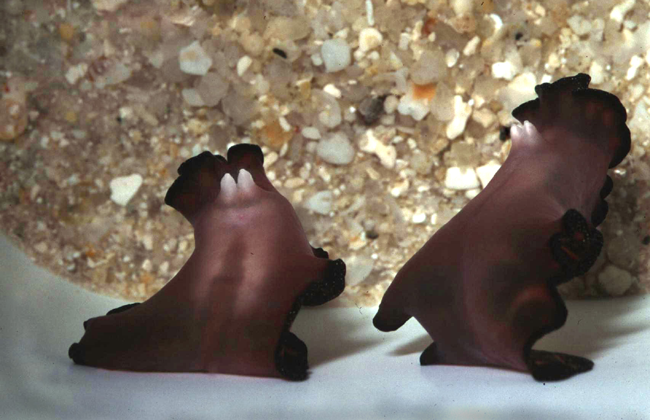
Two turbellarians mating by penis fencing. Each has two penises, the white spikes on the undersides of their heads.

Many turbellarians clone themselves by transverse or longitudinal division, and others, especially acoels, reproduce by budding. The planarian Dugesia is a well-known representative of class Turbellaria.

All turbellarians are simultaneous hermaphrodites, having both female and male reproductive cells, and fertilize eggs internally by copulation. Some of the larger aquatic species mate by penis fencing, a duel in which each tries to impregnate the other, and the loser adopts the female role of developing the eggs.

In turbellarians there are one or more pairs of both testes and ovaries. Sperm ducts run from the testes, through bulb-like seminal vesicles, to the muscular penis. In many species, this basic plan is considerably complicated by the addition of accessory glands or other structures. The penis lies inside a cavity, and can be everted through an opening on the posterior underside of the animal. It often, although not always, possesses a sharp stylet. Unusually among animals, in most species, the sperm cells have two tails, rather than one.

In most species "miniature adults" emerge when the eggs hatch, but a few large species produce plankton-like larvae.

== Taxonomy and evolution ==
- Platyhelminthes
  - Catenulida
  - Rhabditophora
    - various "Turbellaria"
    - - various "Turbellaria"
      - - various "Turbellaria"
        - parasites
          Neodermata (Cestoda, Monogenea, Trematoda)

Internal relationships

Detailed morphological analyses of anatomical features in the mid-1980s and molecular phylogenetics analyses since 2000 using different sections of DNA agree that Acoelomorpha, consisting of Acoela (traditionally regarded as very simple turbellarians) and Nemertodermatida (another small group previously classified as "turbellarians") are the sister group to all other bilaterians, including the rest of the Platyhelminthes.

The Platyhelminthes is a clade consisting of two monophyletic groups, Catenulida and Rhabditophora.

It has been agreed since 1985 that each of the wholly parasitic platyhelminth groups (Cestoda, Monogenea and Trematoda) is monophyletic, and that together these form a larger monophyletic grouping, the Neodermata, in which the adults of all members have syncitial skins. It is also generally agreed that the Neodermata are a relatively small sub-group a few levels down in the "family tree" of the Rhabditophora. Hence the traditional sub-phylum "Turbellaria" is paraphyletic, since it does not include the Neodermata although these are descendants of a sub-group of "turbellarians".

== See also ==
- Urastoma cyprinae
