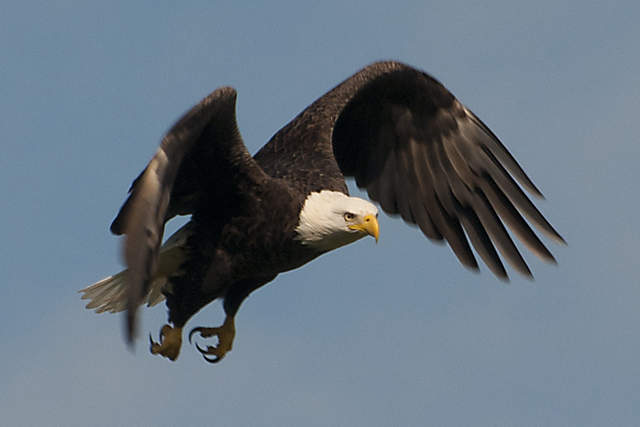
- Bald eagle (Haliaeetus leucocephalus)
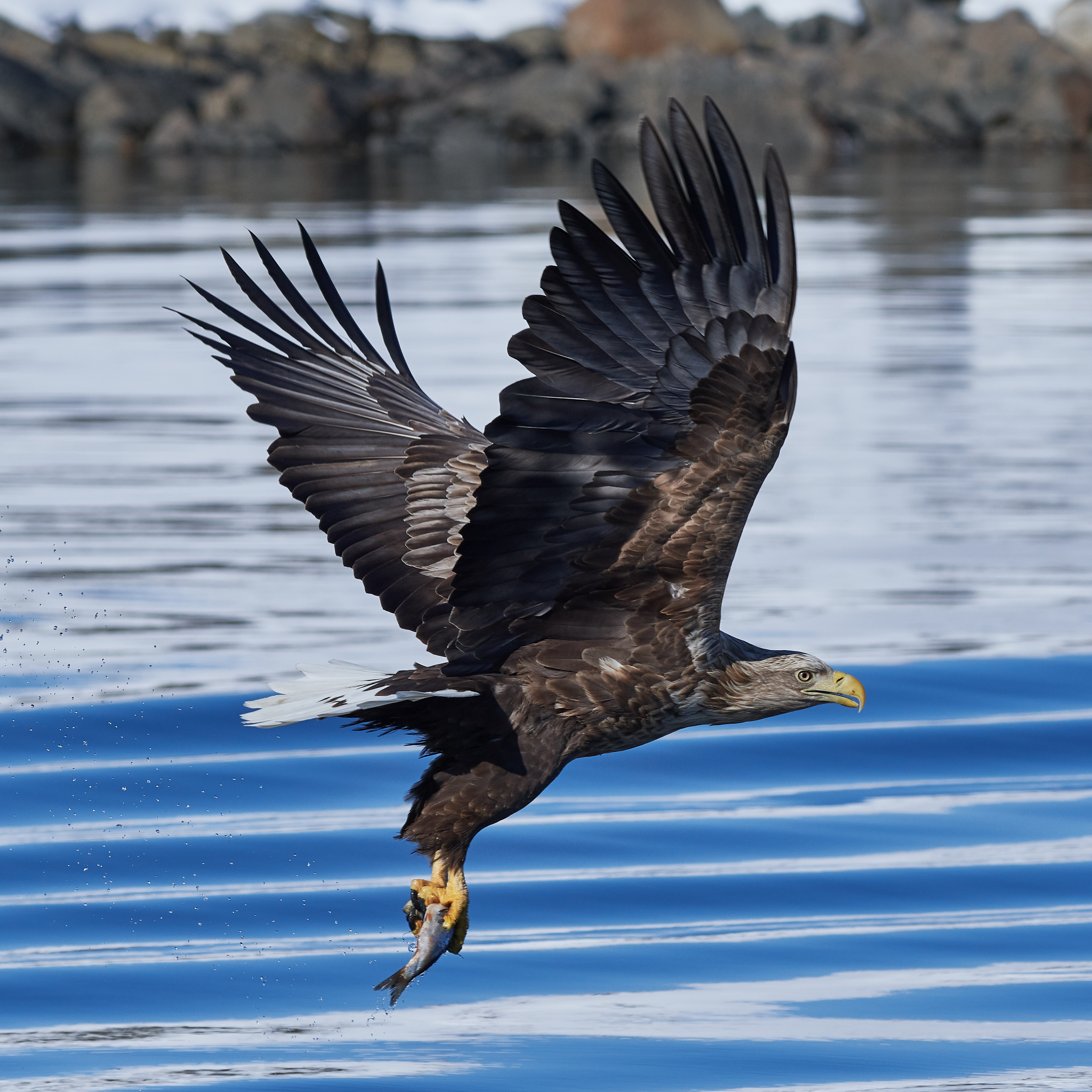
- White-tailed eagle (Haliaeetus albicilla)

Scientific classification
- Kingdom: Animalia
- Phylum: Chordata
- Class: Aves
- Order: Accipitriformes
- Family: Accipitridae
- Subfamily: Buteoninae
- Genus: Haliaeetus; Savigny, 1809

Type species
- Haliaeetus nisis Savigny, 1809 = Falco albicilla Linnaeus, 1758

= Haliaeetus =

Genus of eagles

Haliaeetus is a genus of four species of eagles, closely related to the sea eagles in the genus Icthyophaga.

== Taxonomy ==
The genus Haliaeetus was introduced in 1809 by the French zoologist Marie Jules César Savigny to accommodate a single species, the "L'aigle de mer" with the binomial name Haliaeetus nisus. This is the type species. Savigny's binomial name is now regarded as a junior synonym of Falco albicilla (the white-tailed eagle) that had been described by Carl Linnaeus in 1758. The genus name is from Latin haliaetus or haliaetos meaning "sea-eagle" or "osprey".

This genus includes the following four species:

Genus Haliaeetus – Savigny, 1809 – four species
Common name	Scientific name and subspecies	Range	Size and ecology	IUCN status and estimated population
Bald eagle	Haliaeetus leucocephalus (Linnaeus, 1766) Two subspecies: H. l. leucocephalus (Linnaeus, 1766); H. l. washingtoniensis (Audubon, 1827)	Most of Canada and Alaska, all of the contiguous United States, and northern Mexico	Size: Habitat: Diet:	LC
Pallas's fish eagle	Haliaeetus leucoryphus (Pallas, 1771)	Kazakhstan, Russia, Tajikistan, Turkmenistan, Uzbekistan, Mongolia, China, India, Nepal, Bangladesh, Myanmar and Bhutan.	Size: Habitat: Diet:	EN
White-tailed eagle	Haliaeetus albicilla (Linnaeus, 1758) Two subspecies: H. a. albicilla - (Linnaeus, 1758); H. a. groenlandicus - Brehm, CL, 1831	Greenland and Iceland across Europe and Asia to as far east as Hokkaido, Japan	Size: Habitat: Diet:	LC
Steller's sea eagle	Haliaeetus pelagicus (Pallas, 1811)	Russia, Korea, Japan, China, and Taiwan	Size: Habitat: Diet:	VU
