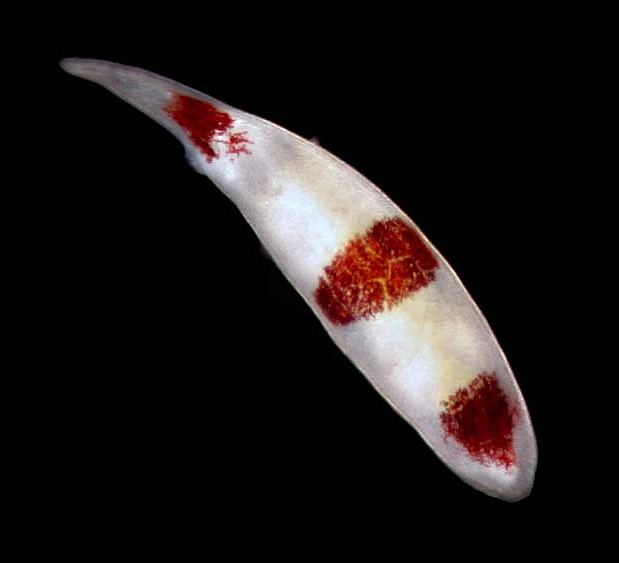
- The candy-cane worm (Plagiostomum vittatum), a common Northeast Atlantic species

Scientific classification
- Kingdom: Animalia
- Phylum: Platyhelminthes
- Subphylum: Rhabditophora
- Order: Prolecithophora; Karling, 1940

Families
- See text

= Prolecithophora =

Order of aquatic flatworms

Prolecithophora is an order consisting of an estimated 300 species of small (typically 0.2 – 12 mm, one species up to 50 mm), active, aquatic flatworms. The order lacks a common English name. Most species are shaped like an elongated, stylized droplet, and are opaque white or yellow; they frequently have contrasting bands or spots in colors, such as purple, yellow, red, or brown. They have no to three (normally two) pairs of pigment-cup eyes, and well-developed tactile and chemoreceptor senses. With few exceptions, species are protandric hermaphrodites with internal fertilization. Egg capsules are, according to species, glued to various hard surfaces; the young hatch as miniature copies of their parents.

== Ecology ==
All prolecithophorans are aquatic, with most living in the oceans. Some species, especially those living in freshwater, are predators and scavengers, but many marine species are associated with colonial animals such as bryozoans or live as symbionts on larger animals such as urchins; a few species harbor symbiotic algae. Although most are accomplished swimmers, they normally rarely venture far from the bottom; young specimens are sometimes found in plankton. Many species display positive or negative phototaxis.

== Distribution ==
The majority of prolecithophorans live in the oceans. There are also brackish and freshwater species; in Lake Baikal, an adaptive radiation has resulted in a number of endemic species. The order has a cosmopolitan distribution; most described species are from temperate waters, while little is known about tropical or deep-sea species. This is probably due to a sampling artefact, as prolecithophorans are known to be common in the tropics; when Norén & Jondelius sampled the shore adjacent to Phuket Marine Biological Center, Phuket, Thailand, they found 14 species of prolecithophorans, all of which were new to science.

== Families ==
The following families are recognised in the order Prolecithophora:

- Multipeniatidae Karling, 1940
  - Multipeniata Nasonov, 1927
- Plagiostomidae - mainly marine, a few freshwater species (e.g. Vänern, Lake Biwa and Lake Tanganyika)
  - Acmostomum Schmarda, 1859
  - Auriculifera Kulinitch, 1973
  - Hydrolimax Haldeman, 1842
  - Plagiostomum Schmidt, 1852
  - Plicastoma Graff, 1904
  - Puzostoma Marcus, 1950
  - Torgea Jondelius, 1997
  - Tuilica Marcus, 1951
  - Vorticeros Schmidt, 1852
- Protomonotresidae Reisinger, 1924 - exclusively freshwater species from Lake Baikal, with one exception
  - Baicalarctiinae Friedman, 1933
    - Baicalarctia Friedmann, 1926
    - Friedmaniella Timoshkin & Zabrovskaya, 1985
    - Porfirievia Timoshkin, 1997
  - Protomonotresinae Timoshkin, 1986
    - Acanthiella Rieger & Sterrer, 1975
    - Archimonotresis Meixner, 1938
    - Prorogonophora Riedl, 1954
    - Protomonotresis Reisinger, 1924
- Pseudostomidae Graff, 1904-08 - exclusively marine species
  - Allostoma Beneden, 1861
  - Cylindrostoma Ørsted, 1845
  - Einarhelmins Karling, 1993
  - Enterostomula Reisinger, 1926
  - Euxinia Graff, 1911
  - Gonostomula Westblad, 1955
  - Monoophorum Bohmig, 1890
  - Pregermarium Stirewalt, Ferguson & Kepner, 1942
  - Pseudostomum Schmidt, 1848
  - Reisingeria Westblad, 1955
  - Thallagus Marcus, 1951
  - Ulianinia Levinsen, 1879
- Scleraulophoridae Marcus, 1950
  - Rosmarium Marcus, 1950
  - Scleraulophorus Karling, 1940
- Urostomatidae
