= Paperbark (disambiguation) =

Paperbark usually refers to one of many species of trees in the Melaleuca genus, mostly found in Australia.

Paperbark, paper bark or paper-bark may also refer to:

== Other trees ==
- Paperbark acacia, or Vachellia sieberiana, a tree native to southern Africa
- Paperbark cherry, or Prunus serrula, found in China
- Paperbark gum, or Eucalyptus chartaboma, a species of gum tree found in Queensland, Australia
- Paperbark maple, or Acer griseum, a type of maple found in China
- Paperbark satinash, or Syzygium papyraceum, a Queensland rainforest tree
- Paperbark or saltwater paperbark, or Melaleuca cuticularis, a tree found in Western Australia and South Australia
- Paperbark or tea tree paperbark or broad-leaved paperbark, or Melaleuca quinquenervia, a tree found on the eastern seaboard of Australia, New Caledonia and Papua New Guinea.

== Other uses ==
- Paper Bark Press, an independent publisher of poetry in Australia, 1986 to 2002
- Paperbark (video game), an Australian video game, released in 2018
- Paperbark flycatcher, a bird

== See also ==
- Kungarakany, an Aboriginal Australian people who were named "Paperbark People" by Europeans
