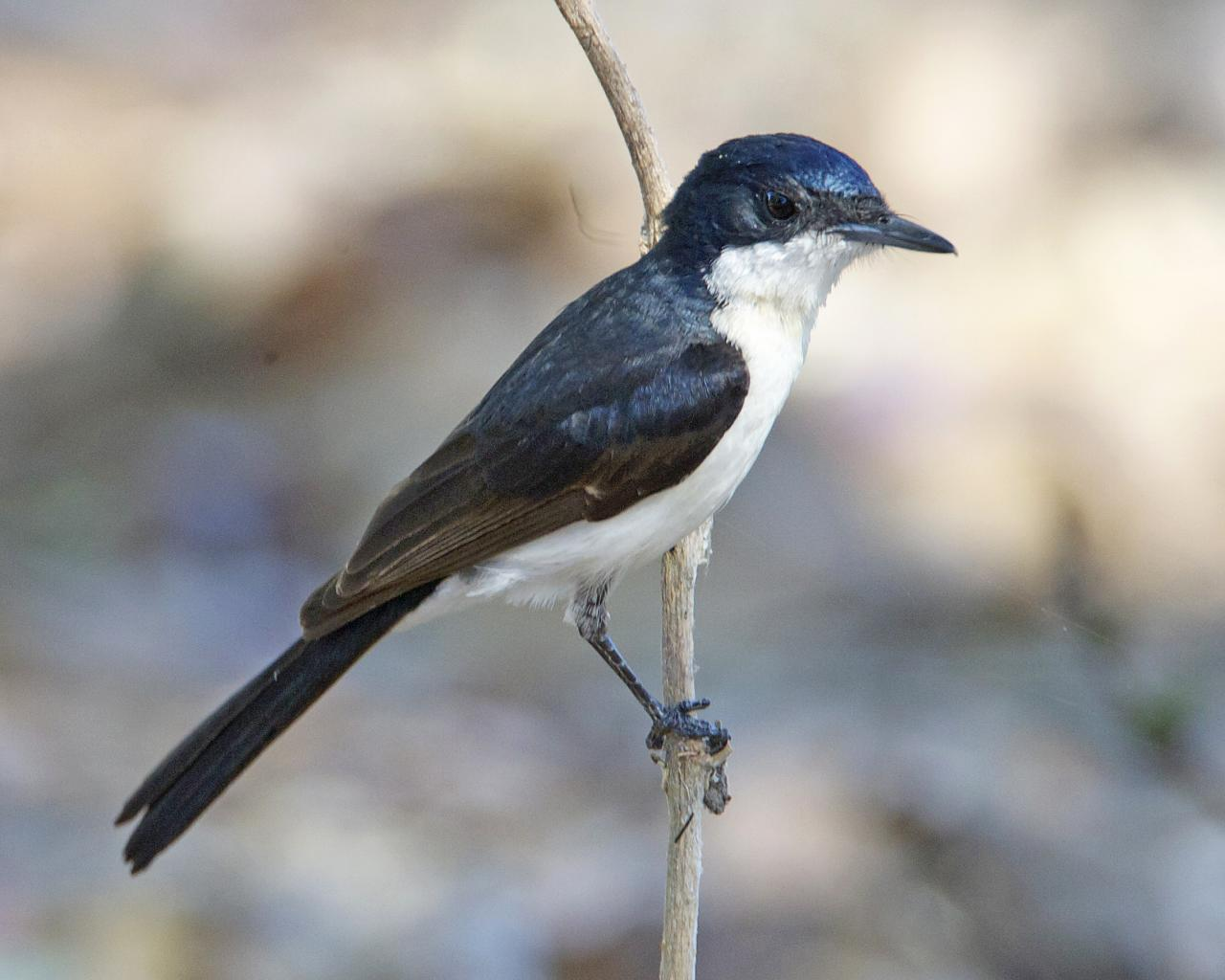

Conservation status
- Least Concern (IUCN 3.1)

Scientific classification
- Kingdom: Animalia
- Phylum: Chordata
- Class: Aves
- Order: Passeriformes
- Family: Monarchidae
- Genus: Myiagra
- Species: M. inquieta

Binomial name
- Myiagra inquieta (Latham, 1801)

Synonyms
- Myiagra westralensis; Seisura inquieta; Turdus inquietus

= Restless flycatcher =

Species of bird

The restless flycatcher (Myiagra inquieta) or restless myiagra is a passerine bird in the family Monarchidae; it is also known as the razor grinder or scissors grinder because of its distinctive call. It is a native of eastern and southern Australia. Populations in New Guinea and northern Australia, which were at one time considered to be a subspecies, are now accepted as a separate species, the paperbark flycatcher (Myiagra nana). It is a small to medium-sized bird and has similar colouring to the willie wagtail.

== Taxonomy and systematics ==
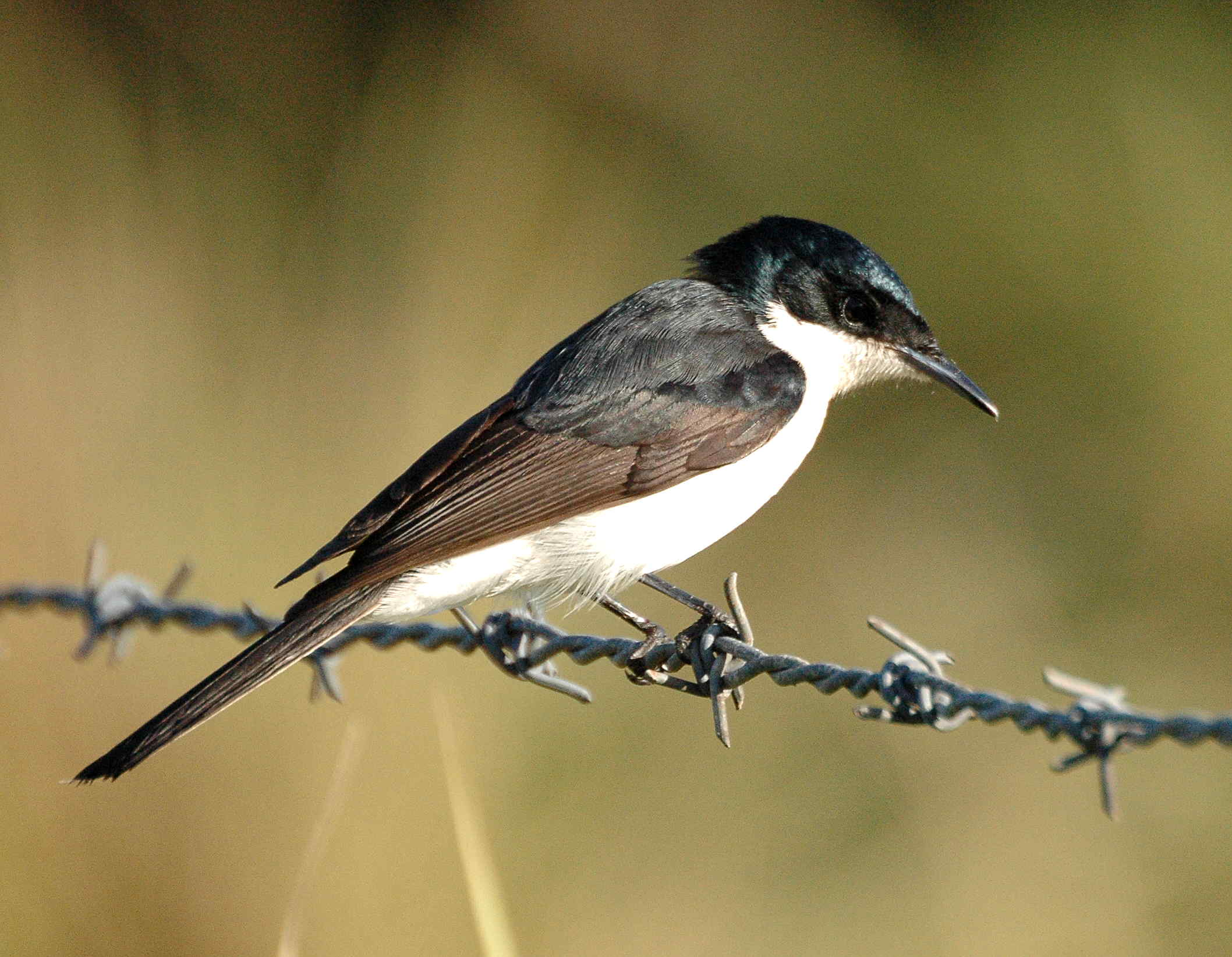
Photographed at Dayboro, SE Queensland, Australia

Also known colloquially as razor grinder, scissors grinder, dishlicker or dishwasher on account of its unusual call, the restless flycatcher was first described by ornithologist John Latham in 1801 under the binomial name Turdus inquietus. Its specific epithet is derived from the Latin inquietus 'restless'. Populations from northern Australia and New Guinea, formerly considered a distinctive subspecies, are now separated as the paperbark flycatcher (Myiagra nana), with which it forms a superspecies.

The Yuwaalaraay people of northern New South Wales use the name garaayaa to refer to this species.

== Description ==
It is about 20 cm (8 in) long, with a glossy dark blue crest, a grey-blue back and white underparts. It is similar to the willie wagtail, though the lack of a black throat, crest on head, white eyebrow and slenderer body shape are distinguishing features.

== Distribution and habitat ==
The restless flycatcher is found throughout east, south-east and south-west Australia. From Cairns in Far North Queensland into west of Central Queensland and most of New South Wales, Victoria, southern South Australia and south-west of Western Australia. During winter many south and south-eastern populations move further north. Its habitat is usually open and wooded forests, in river red gums near water, inland and coastal scrubs and some semi-urban environments.

== Conservation ==
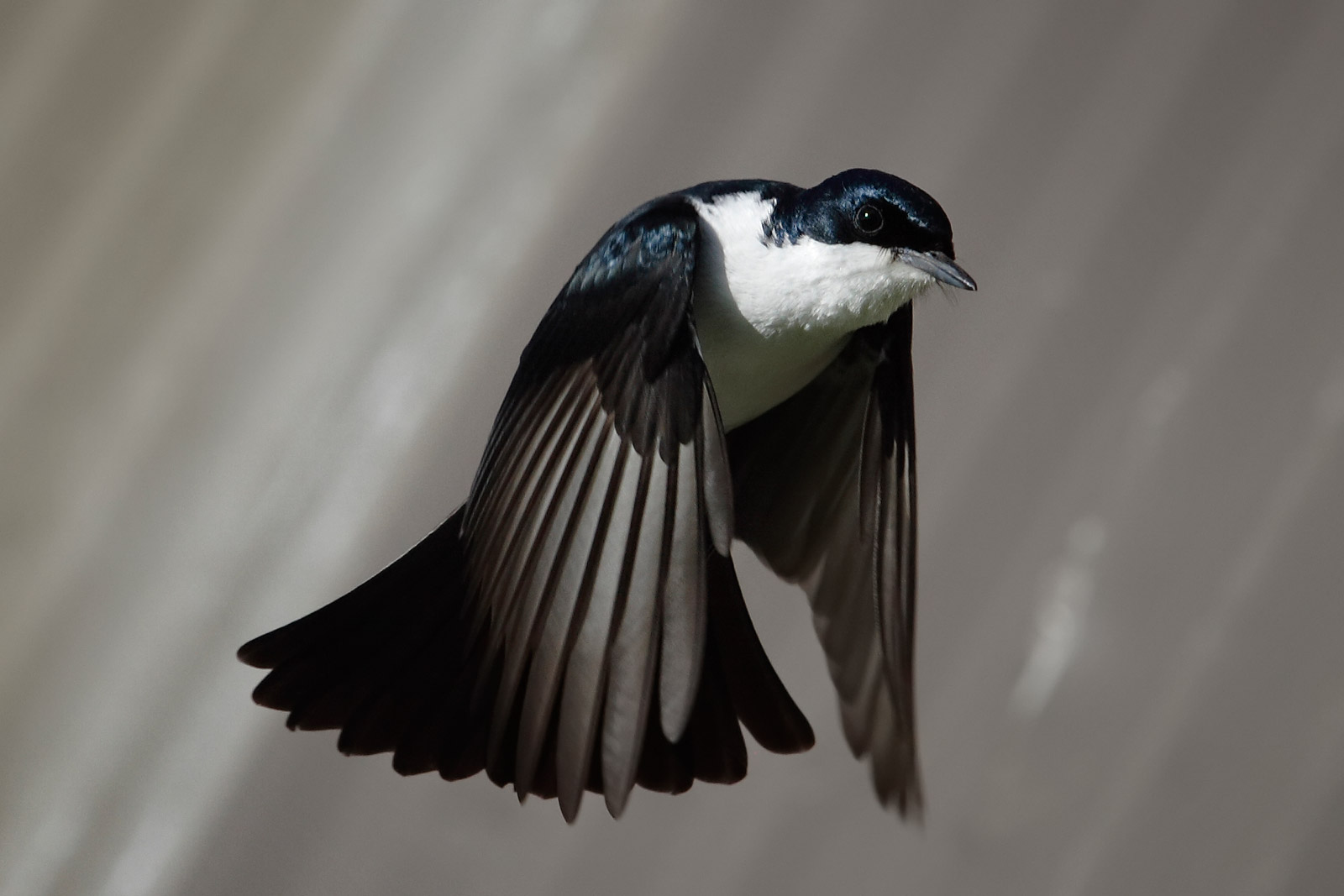
Restless flycatcher in flight

Despite being described as of least concern by the IUCN, their population is decreasing. The exact number of individuals is unknown.

== Behaviour and ecology ==
=== Breeding ===
The restless flycatcher builds a cup-shaped nest from shredded bark and grasses, matted and bound with spider-webbing. Linings used are soft bark, grasses, hair or feathers. It is often decorated with lichen, strips of bark or spiders' egg sacs. The nest site is in the fork of a well-foliaged tree mostly near or overhanging water, though it can be up to twenty or more metres above the ground. They will lay three, light-grey to white glossy eggs with brown or dark spots at the larger end.

=== Food and feeding ===
The restless flycatcher feeds on insects, as well as other invertebrates such as spiders and centipedes and will feed alone or in pairs. It often hovers with its head and tail pointed downwards as it picks insects off from leaves, and it rarely goes to the ground, preferring to hunt insects from mid-canopy.

== Footnotes ==
Cited texts

- Beruldsen, Gordon (2003). Australian Birds: Their Nests and Eggs (revised ed.). Kenmore Hills, Qld: self. ISBN 978-0-646-42798-0. OCLC 615122047.
- Boles, Walter E. (1988). The Robins and Flycatchers of Australia. Sydney: Angus & Robertson. ISBN 978-0-207-15400-3. OCLC 59196420.
- Christidis, Les; Boles, Walter (2008). Systematics and taxonomy of Australian birds. Melbourne: CSIRO Publishing. ISBN 978-0-643-06511-6. OCLC 488685950.
- Schodde, Richard; Mason, Ian J. (1999). The Directory of Australian Birds: Passerines. Melbourne: CSIRO Publishing. ISBN 978-0-643-06456-0. OCLC 499953986.
- Simpson, D. P. (1979). Cassell's Latin Dictionary (5th ed.). London: Cassell Ltd. ISBN 978-0-304-52257-6. OCLC 7260402.

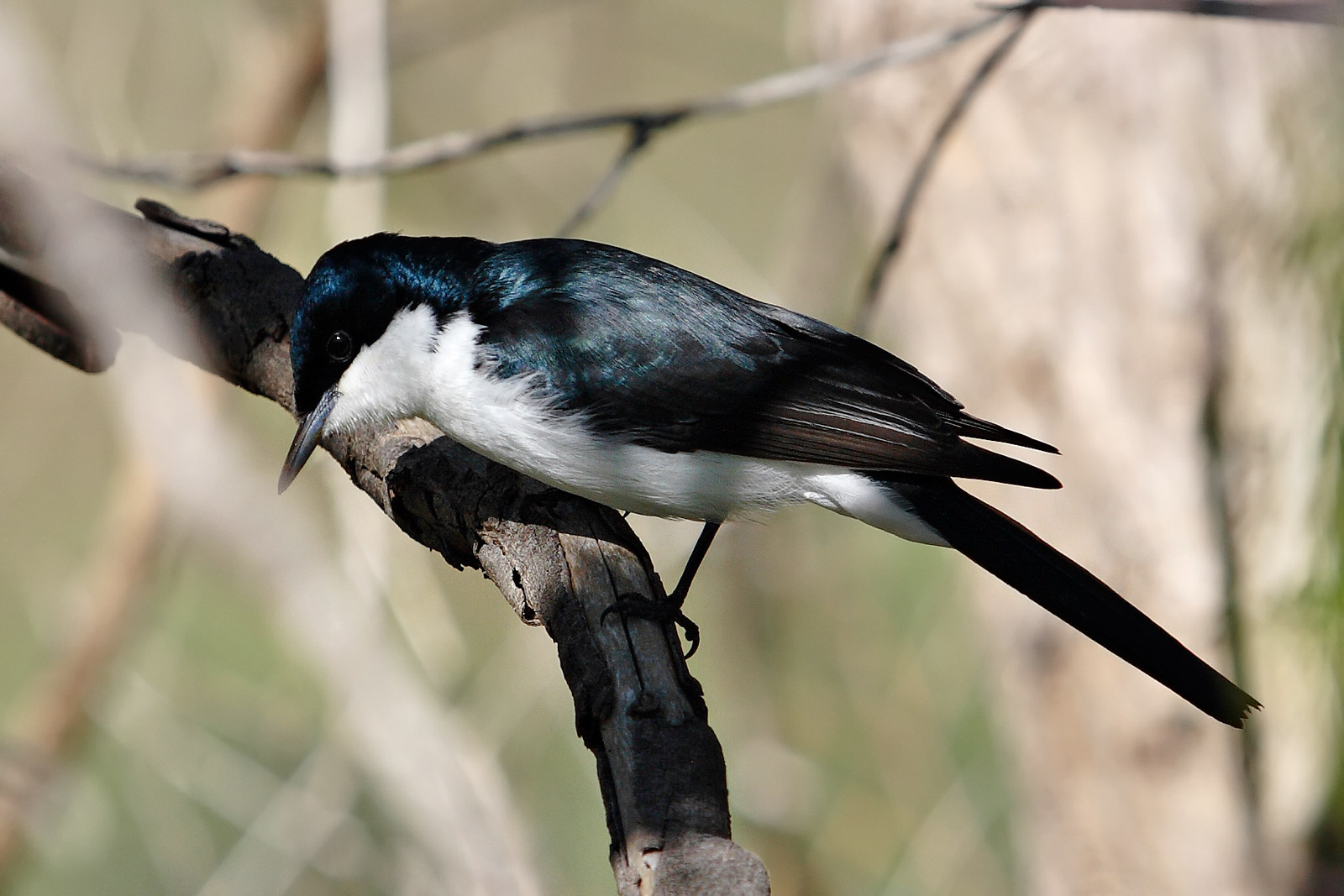
Restless flycatcher

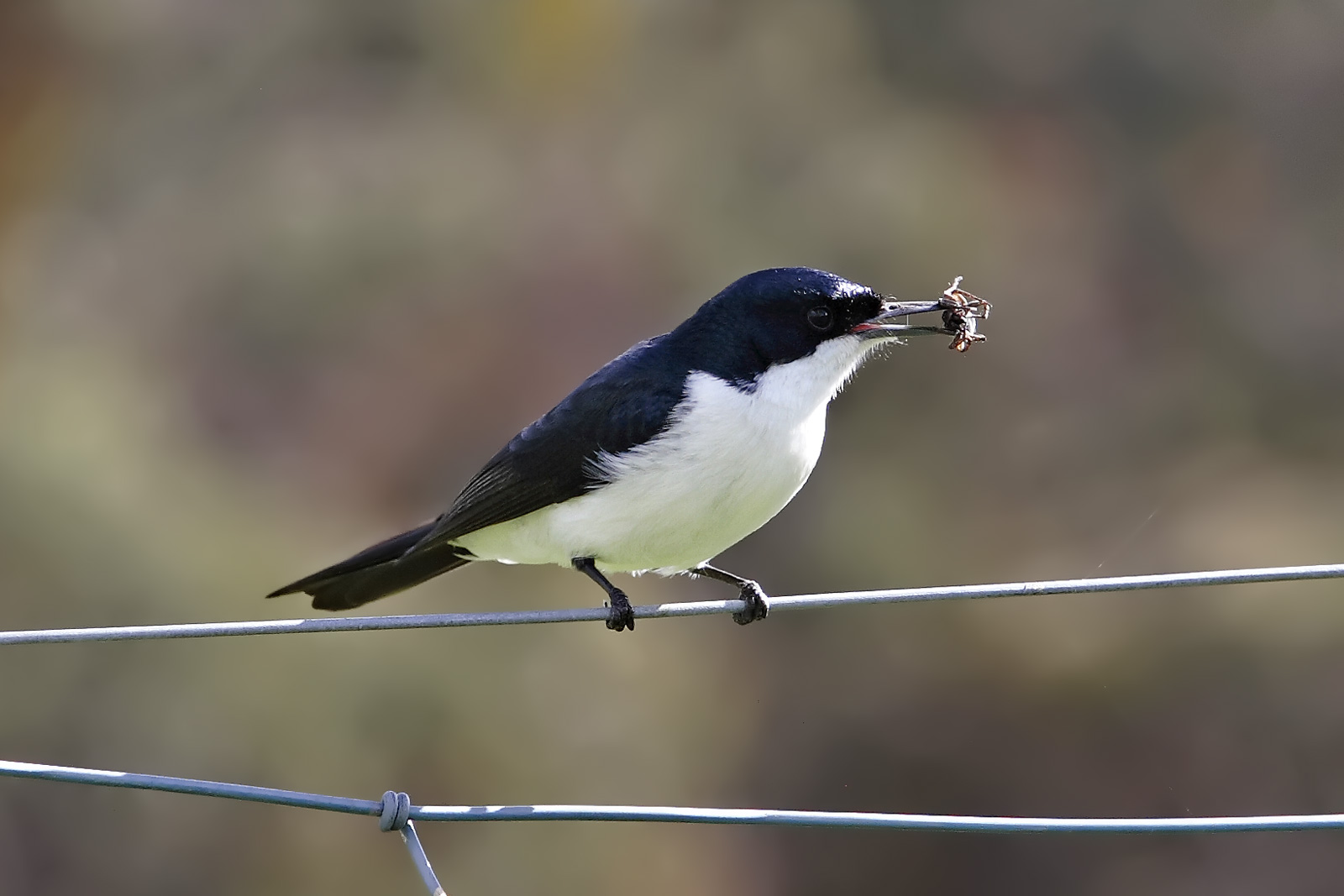
Contrary to their name, restless flycatchers do not only eat flies. Here, one is pictured with a huntsman spider.
