= A Photographic Guide to the Birds of Indonesia =

Book by Morten Strange

- First edition
- Author: Morten Strange
- Illustrator: Morten Strange et al.
- Language: English
- Subject: Birds in the Republic of Indonesia
- Genre: Photographic Guide
- Published: 2001/2012/2024 Tuttle Publishing; a division of Periplus Editions (HK) Ltd
- Publication place: Singapore
- Media type: Print (softcover)
- Pages: 544
- ISBN: 978-0-8048-5839-7

A Photographic Guide to the Birds of Indonesia is a photographic guide of the birds in Indonesia. It is the only bird book covering the nation as a country with more than 280 million people and more endemic and globally threatened bird species than any other in the world.

== History ==
The book was first published in 2001 by Periplus Editions (HK) Ltd. Production and editorial work was done by Berkeley Books Pte Ltd in Singapore. Publisher was Eric Oey; Julia Walkden and Rod Ritchie were the editors. Dr. Bas van Balen provided advice as scientific editor. The binding in the first edition was a normal paperback cover with a collage of six different birds.

The first edition was 190 mm high and 125 mm wide, weighing 575 grams. In this edition Morten Strange was credited with both text and photos. It covered 686 species; most were illustrated by the author; some 30 other bird photographers provided additional images. In both the first and the second edition of the book there are two bird species featured per page, each with one or more photographs as well as a distribution map. The taxonomy and nomenclature in the first edition followed The Birds of Indonesia: a Checklist by Peter Andrew from 1992; this was the most used checklist at the time, using the so-called ‘crows-last’ sequence. The book was a companion to A Photographic Guide to the Birds of Southeast Asia which was published the previous year, in 2000. However, this volume used a different checklist as a reference with a ‘buntings last’ sequence.

A Photographic Guide to the Birds of Indonesia was reprinted several times during the following years, but without corrections or updates. In 2003, it was co-published in a deal with Princeton University Press for the US market and Christopher Helm (an imprint of A&C Black Publishers Ltd) for the UK market; some of these imprints might still appear as used copies on internet book sites. Periplus distributed the book in Asia and in Indonesia, where it sold well. By 2012 a lot of new information and photographic material on the birds of Indonesia had emerged, and work on a second edition was started. The editorial work was again done in Singapore under supervision of Nancy Goh at Berkeley Books Pte Ltd. The second edition involved a total revamp of the material; a new checklist was used on the basis of The Clements Checklist of Birds of the World 6th Edition from 2007. This list has 1,605 bird species for Indonesia, while the 1992 list had 1,534. It also uses the ‘buntings last’ sequence which means that the Indonesian book now uses the same sequence as the companion volume A Photographic Guide to the Birds of Southeast Asia. However, while Southeast Asia came out in 2012 with just a new cover and imprint, Indonesia came out that year in a second edition and was dramatically changed.

The new cover is flexibound vinyl extending out over the content pages. There is a single cover photo; the book is published using the Tuttle Publishing imprint. Periplus Editions (HK) Ltd is now the sole distributor of the book. In this edition, Morten Strange is credited as the author but not with text and photos, as only some 50% of the photographs are now his. In the second edition, new photographers such as James Eaton, Robert Hutchinson, Pete Morris and Bram Demeulemeester are the main contributors of new, rare and endemic species. Filip Verbelen, who also contributed to the first edition, is now next to the author as the main contributor. A total of more than 40 bird photographer participated in the project, including new Indonesian field researchers. The second edition was expanded from 416 to 544 pages and now weighs 780 grams and illustrates 912 species, out of which 213 are endemic (found only in Indonesia). As such, it is the most comprehensive photographic bird guide to any country in the world. In the second edition the opening chapters have been totally re-written and updated; the book now also includes an annotated checklist to all the species in Indonesia, the ones covered in the photographic section are highlighted in the full checklist at the back of the book.

In 2014, the book was reprinted with corrections and updates. An additional 37 photos were replaced with new and better ones; a misidentified bird (the Flores hawk-eagle) was renamed, and another species (Sumatran laughingthrush) was split out as endemic following the latest taxonomy. Threat status and icons for all globally threatened species were revised, and the annotations in the checklist were updated for each subregion using the latest information available.

In 2015, the book was reprinted again. In this reprint, two photographs were replaced and all nomenclature, taxonomy, distribution data and global threat status was updated throughout the book. The total number of species in the checklist was revised upwards to 1608 species.

In 2024, Tuttle Publishing issued an Updated Second Edition of the book. The author researched the necessary changes and Nancy Goh with the Singapore office again supervised the editorial work. Ch’ien Lee provided the new cover photograph of a Red-bellied (North Moluccan) Pitta. Inside the book, an additional five photographs were replaced with better ones and all nomenclature and taxonomy updated. Following numerous taxonomic splits and new national bird records, the updated complete checklist then covered 1,634 species; 406 of those are endemic to Indonesia and 317 are threatened with global extinction, near-threatened or data deficient.

== Edition ==
- 1st - 2001
- Reprinted under new imprints – 2003
- Second Edition - 2012
- Reprinted with updates and corrections - 2014
- Reprinted with updates - 2015
- Updated Second Edition - 2024

== Sources ==
- Strange, Morten (2024), A Photographic Guide to the Birds of Indonesia: Updated Second Edition. Periplus Editions (HK) Ltd. ISBN 978-0-8048-5839-7.
- Strange, Morten (2012), A Photographic Guide to the Birds of Indonesia: Second Edition. Periplus Editions (HK) Ltd. ISBN 978-0-8048-4200-6.
- Strange, Morten (2000), A Photographic Guide to the Birds of Southeast Asia. Periplus Editions (HK) Ltd. ISBN 978-0-8048-4451-2.
- http://www.tuttlepublishing.com/books-by-country/a-photographic-guide-to-the-birds-of-indonesia
