= A Field Guide to Nests and Eggs of Australian Birds =

1980 book by Gordon Beruldsen

- First edition cover
- Author: Gordon Beruldsen
- Language: English
- Series: Rigby Field Guides
- Subject: Nests and eggs of Australian birds
- Genre: Field guide
- Published: 1980 (Rigby: Adelaide, South Australia)
- Publication place: Australia
- Media type: Print (hardcover) with dust jacket
- Pages: 448
- ISBN: 0-7270-1202-9
- Dewey Decimal: 598.29’94

A Field Guide to Nests and Eggs of Australian Birds is a guide to the identification of the nests and eggs of Australian birds, authored by Gordon Beruldsen.

== First edition ==
Published in 1980 by Rigby of Adelaide, South Australia, in its series of field guides to Australian natural history, the book is 190 mm high by 130 mm wide. It consists of three parts; Part One contains general information; Part Two contains separate keys to the identification of nests and eggs, as well as the colour plates that illustrate them; Part Three, comprising three-quarters of the book's contents, contains the individual species descriptions.

== Second edition ==
A second and revised edition (ISBN 0-646-42798-9), with the new title Australian Birds their Nests and Eggs, was produced and issued by the author in 2003 from his home in Kenmore Hills, Brisbane. Its dimensions are 209 mm in height by 147 mm in width. It is a paperback, xvi + 424 pages in length, contains updated information and includes new photographic colour plates of the eggs as well as other additional photographs.
