= Eucalyptus chartaboma =

Paperbark gum

Scientific classification
- Kingdom: Plantae
- Clade: Tracheophytes
- Clade: Angiosperms
- Clade: Eudicots
- Clade: Rosids
- Order: Myrtales
- Family: Myrtaceae
- Genus: Eucalyptus
- Species: E. chartaboma

Binomial name
- Eucalyptus chartaboma D.Nicolle

Species of eucalyptus

Eucalyptus chartaboma, commonly known as paperbark gum, is a eucalypt that is endemic to Queensland. It is a medium-sized tree with soft, papery, fibrous bark on the lower trunk, smooth white to pale cream-coloured bark above, lance-shaped adult leaves, flower buds in groups of seven, orange-coloured flowers and oval to urn-shaped fruit. The flower buds and fruit have distinct ribs along their sides.

== Description ==
Eucalyptus chartaboma is a tree that grows to a height of up to 18 m (59 ft), often with several stems, and forms a lignotuber. The bark on the lower trunk is soft, fibrous and papery, brownish to white, smooth white to cream-coloured above. The leaves on young plants and on coppice regrowth are egg-shaped, dull green, 50–90 mm (2.0–3.5 in) long and 30–45 mm (1.2–1.8 in) wide. Adult leaves are lance-shaped, a paler shade of dull green on the lower side, 85–165 mm (3.3–6.5 in) long and 13–25 mm (0.51–0.98 in) wide. The flower buds are arranged in groups of seven in leaf axils on a peduncle 16–30 mm (0.63–1.18 in) long, the individual flowers sessile or on a pedicel up to 5 mm (0.20 in) long. Mature buds are glaucous, spindle-shaped to diamond-shaped, 16–21 mm (0.63–0.83 in) long and 8–11 mm (0.31–0.43 in) wide, with ribs along the sides and a conical operculum. Flowering occurs between January and April and the flowers are orange. The fruit is a woody truncated oval to urn-shaped capsule 30–75 mm (1.2–3.0 in) long and 30–65 mm (1.2–2.6 in) wide, with ribs along the sides and the valves enclosed.

== Taxonomy and naming ==
Eucalyptus chartaboma was first formally described in 2000 by Dean Nicolle from a specimen collected north of Mount Garnet and the description was published in the journal Nuytsia. The specific epithet (chartaboma) is derived from the Ancient Greek words charte meaning "leaf of paper" and bomos meaning "base", "stand" or "altar", referring to papery bark on the trunk of this eucalypt.

== Distribution and habitat ==
Paperbark gum usually grows on low hills and occurs in scattered locations near Croydon, Einasleigh and Mount Garnet, then as far north as Maitland Downs on the southern Cape York Peninsula.

== See also ==
- List of Eucalyptus species
