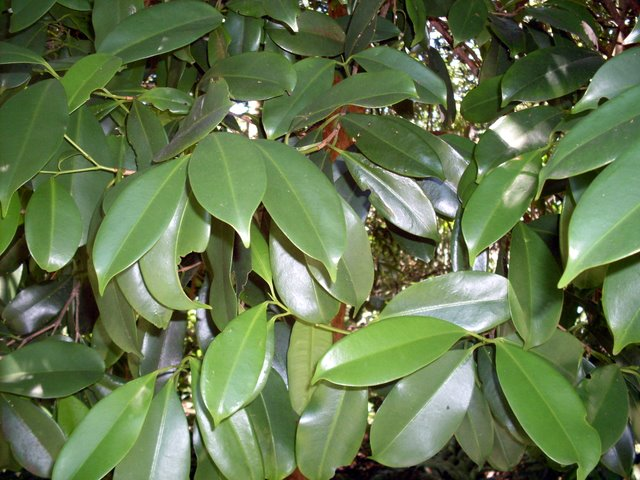
- Foliage, at Royal Botanic Gardens, Sydney

Conservation status
- Least Concern (NCA)

Scientific classification
- Kingdom: Plantae
- Clade: Tracheophytes
- Clade: Angiosperms
- Clade: Eudicots
- Clade: Rosids
- Order: Myrtales
- Family: Myrtaceae
- Genus: Syzygium
- Species: S. papyraceum

Binomial name
- Syzygium papyraceum B.Hyland

= Syzygium papyraceum =

Paperbark satinash

Species of flowering plant

Syzygium papyraceum, known as the paperbark satinash, is a rainforest tree of northeastern Queensland, Australia. It can grow to 35 m (115 ft) tall and 90 cm (35 in) in diameter, with papery red-brown bark. Leaves are simple (i.e. undivided), arranged in opposite pairs, and measure up to 10 cm (3.9 in) long and 5 cm (2.0 in) wide. Attractive pink or mauve flowers are followed by purple fruit. It was first described in 1983 by the Australian botanist Bernard Hyland.

== Conservation ==
This species is listed as least concern under the Queensland Government's Nature Conservation Act. As of 9 November 2024, it has not been assessed by the International Union for Conservation of Nature (IUCN).

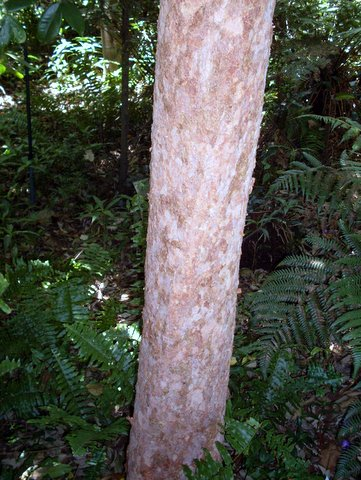
Bark

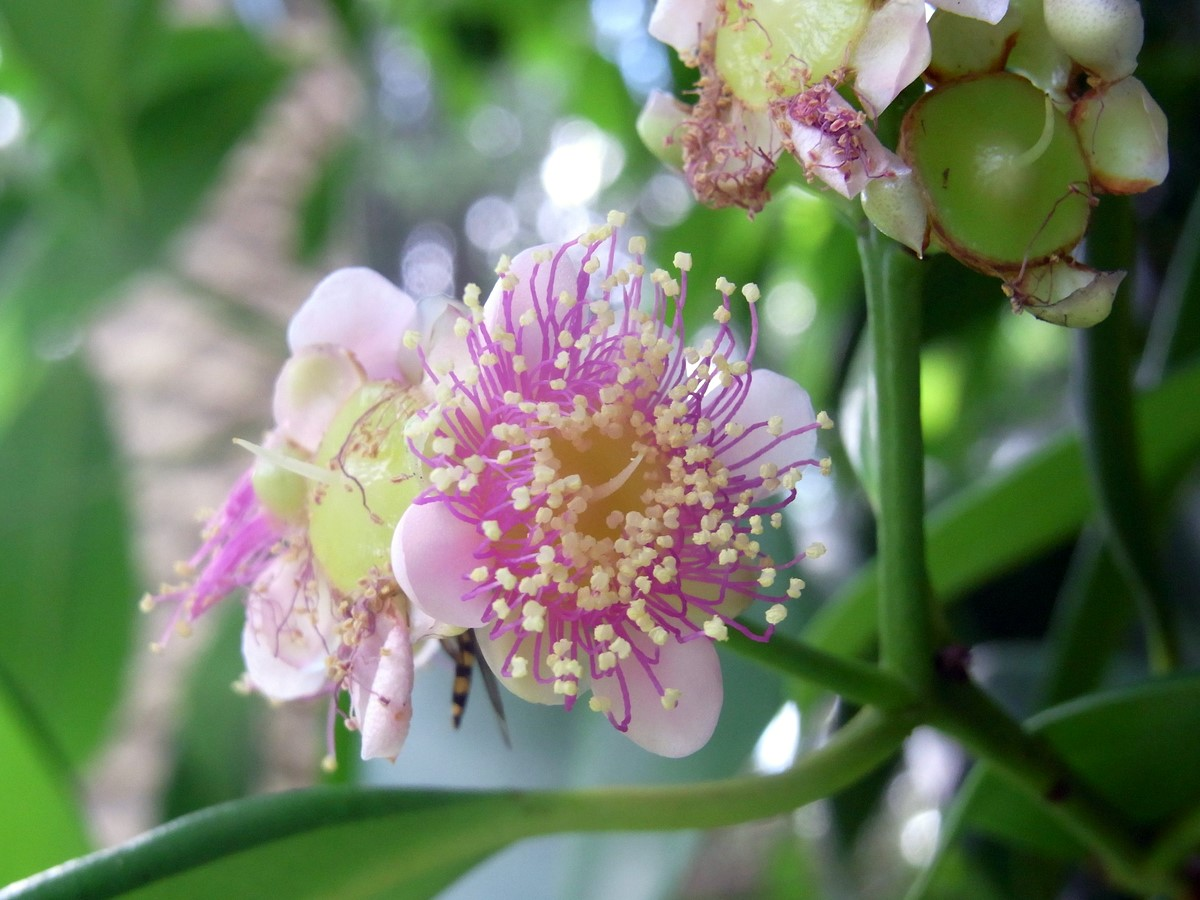
Flowers

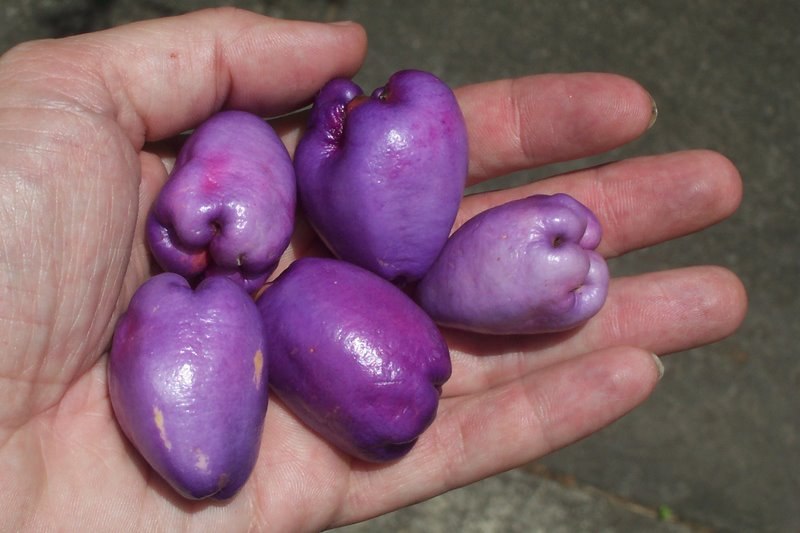
Fruit

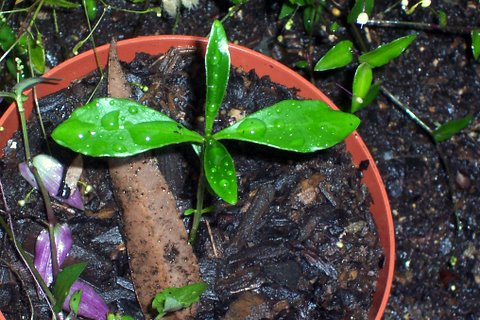
Seedling
