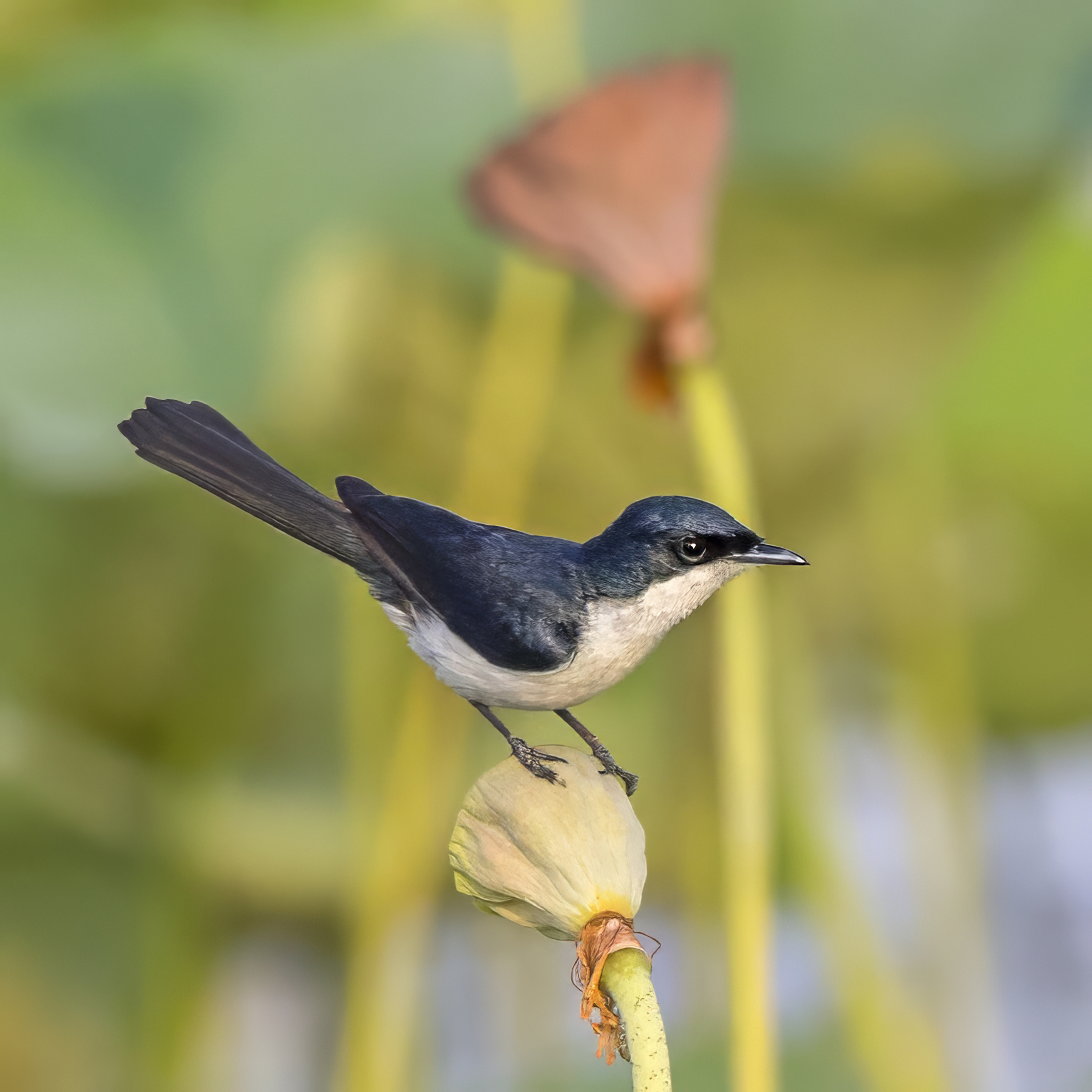
- Kakadu National Park, Northern Territory

Conservation status
- Least Concern (IUCN 3.1)

Scientific classification
- Kingdom: Animalia
- Phylum: Chordata
- Class: Aves
- Order: Passeriformes
- Family: Monarchidae
- Genus: Myiagra
- Species: M. nana

Binomial name
- Myiagra nana (Gould, 1870)

Synonyms
- Seisura nana Gould, 1870; Seisura inquieta rogersi Mathews, 1921; Seisura inquieta nana Mathews, 1930; Myiagra inquieta nana Mayr, 1986

= Paperbark flycatcher =

Species of bird

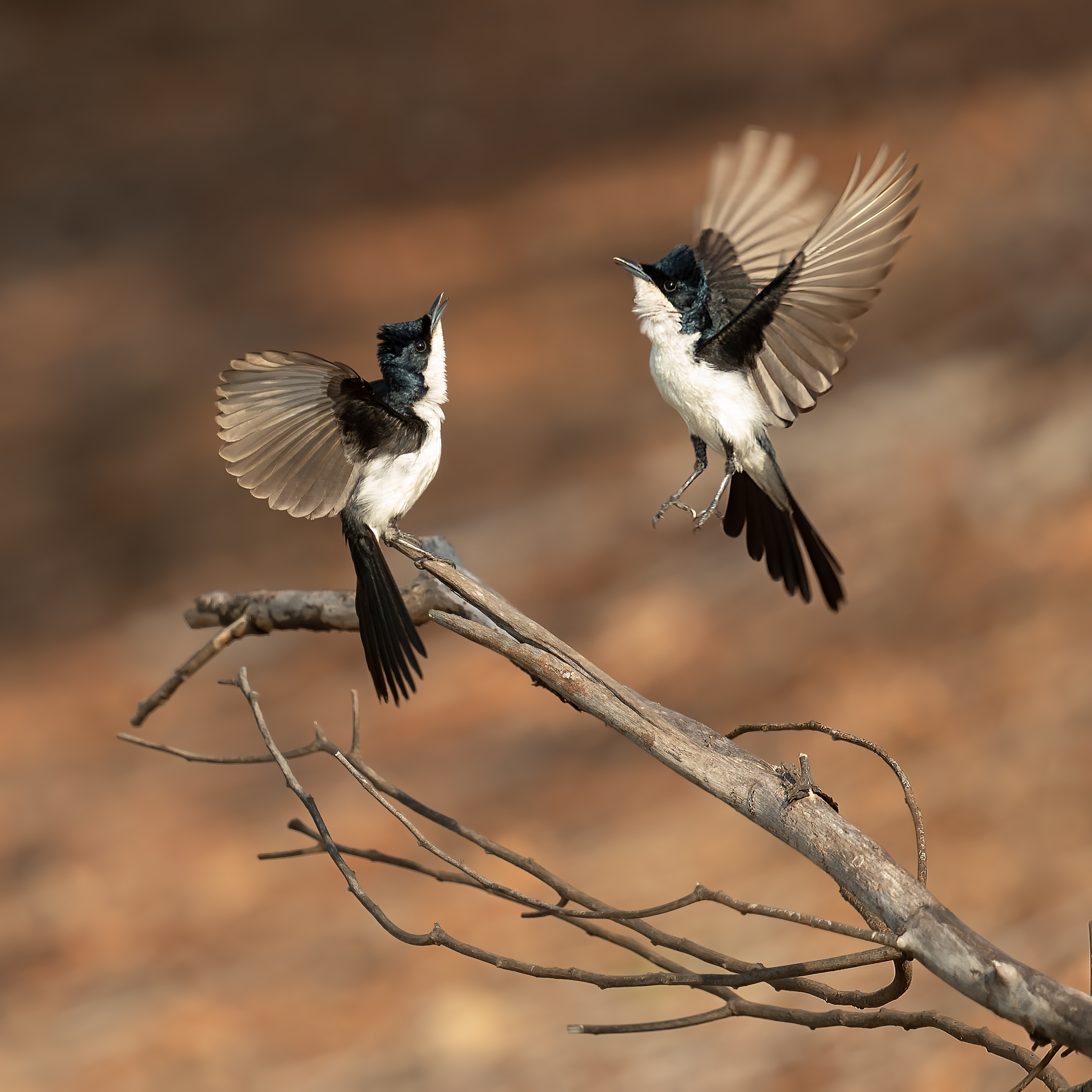
Fogg Dam, Northern Territory

The paperbark flycatcher (Myiagra nana), also known as the little restless flycatcher, is a passerine bird in the family Monarchidae. It occurs in tropical woodland and riverine habitats of northern Australia and southern New Guinea. Previously, some authorities lumped the paperbark flycatcher as a distinctive subspecies of the restless flycatcher (Myiagra inquieta) of southern and eastern Australia, with which it forms a superspecies.

== Taxonomy and systematics ==
Originally described as Seisura nana by John Gould in 1870, the paperbark flycatcher was long treated as a subspecies of the restless flycatcher (M. inquieta), until 1999 when Schodde and Mason identified the distinctness and lack of intergrading in closely situated populations of the two parapatric taxa.

== Description ==
The paperbark flycatcher is broadly similar to the restless flycatcher, with entirely black upperparts from the crown and sides of the head, in contrast with entirely white underparts from the throat to the vent. It is a smaller bird, at only two-thirds the weight of its southern relative, and has a proportionately shorter and broader bill, with longer and stouter rictal bristles. There is no overlap in size between the species. The back and the crown of nana are the same glossy black, while inquieta has a slightly paler, slate-grey, back. There are also differences in the vocalisations: nana almost never use the distinctive "scissors-grinding" call of inquieta.

== Distribution and habitat ==
The flycatcher is found in northern Australia, from the Kimberley region of Western Australia, across the Top End of the Northern Territory, to the Gulf Country and south-western Cape York Peninsula of north-west Queensland, with a population on Saibai Island in Torres Strait. It is also found in southern New Guinea from Merauke eastwards to the Bensbach River in the Middle Fly District. The paperbark flycatcher does not overlap in distribution with the restless; although their ranges abut in northern Queensland there are no signs of intergradation between the two species, and in the area where the ranges meet most of the restless flycatchers are non-breeding migrants.

In Australia the paperbark flycatcher inhabits tropical eucalypt woodlands, paperbark woodlands and dry riverine woodlands. In New Guinea, where it is locally common along the lower reaches of the Bensbach River, it frequents scrub, partly submerged trees, and sedgeland bordering rivers on floodplains and savanna.

== Behaviour ==
A conspicuous bird, the paperbark flycatcher is usually seen in pairs or singly. It sweeps its tail restlessly from side to side and often hovers near the ground when searching for food.

=== Breeding ===
Nesting habits in New Guinea are undescribed. In northern Australia breeding takes place from November to January. The nest is a neat cup built of bark shreds and grass stems in the fork of a dead shrub near water. One whitish egg, spotted reddish-brown and grey, is laid.
