= Morten Strange =

Danish photographer and financial analyst

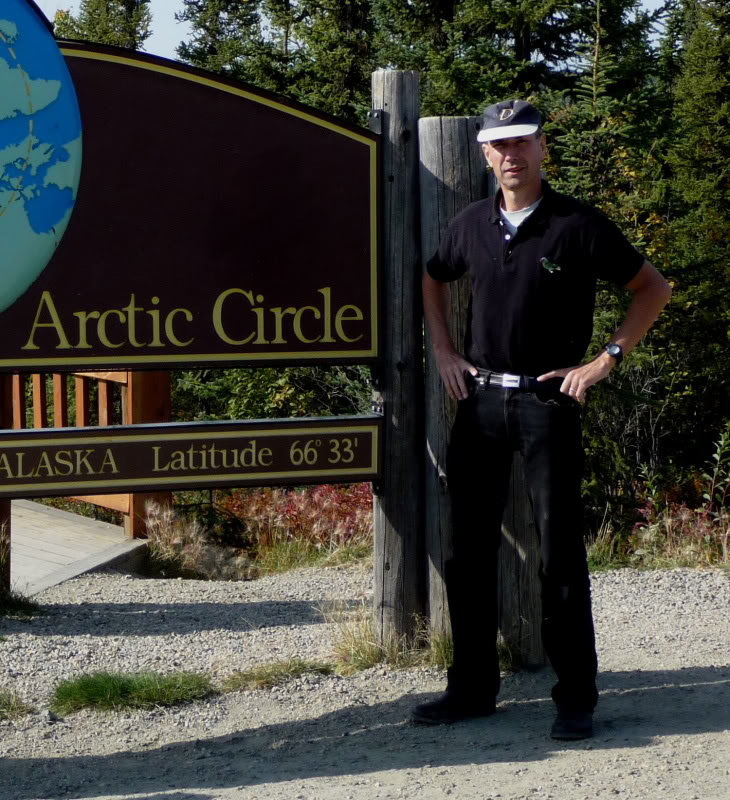
Morten Strange

Morten Strange (born 18 September 1952) is a Danish-born, Singapore-based independent financial analyst. He is a former bird photographer, author and publisher. Strange was born in Copenhagen, Denmark, and studied economics at Aarhus University 1971–73; he served in the Danish army as a sergeant in the field artillery. From 1974, Strange worked in the offshore oil industry in the North Sea and later in South-east Asia and China as a field services engineer; he retired from the oil business in 1986 as a field services supervisor. Since then, Strange has worked for the Danish Ornithological Society (as international officer 1994–1996), for Nature's Niche Pte Ltd (as marketing manager 1999–2008) and for Draco Publishing and Distribution Pte Ltd (as managing director 2008–2013). Strange was based in Singapore from 1980 to 1993 and again from 1999 onwards, and is now a Singapore permanent resident; he is the father of four sons from two marriages.

Before and after his oil field career, Strange was an active bird photographer, writer, and editor. He has authored many books, especially about rainforest birds in the South-east Asian region. He was editor-in-chief of Nature Watch, the official magazine of Nature Society (Singapore) from 2009–2012, and he served as Honorary Secretary for that society 2019–2023. In 2014 he qualified from the Institute of Banking and Finance as a financial fund manager and adviser. He currently works as an independent financial analyst and is the author of Be Financially Free: How to become salary independent in today's economy (Marshall Cavendish, 2016) as well as The Ethical Investor's Handbook: How to grow your money without wrecking the Earth (Marshall Cavendish, 2018) and Are You Sustainable? Future-proofing your finances in the new economy of work (Marshall Cavendish, 2023).

== Bibliography ==
- Terner (1971). Out of print
- Edderfuglen (1971). Out of print
- Strandskaden (1971). Out of print
- Hættemågen (1973). Out of print
- Viben (1973). Out of print
- Stæren (1973). Out of print
- Olieboring i Nordsøen (1979). Out of print
- En Sommer i Alaska (1980). Out of print
- A Photographic Guide to the Birds of Peninsular Malaysia and Singapore (1993). Out of print
- Parrots: A Selection (1994). Out of print
- Fuglene kender ikke Grænser (edited, 1996). Out of print
- Culture Shock! Denmark (1996). Available from Marshall Cavendish, 5th revised edition, 2009.
- Tropical Birds of Southeast Asia (1998). Out of print
- Birds of South-east Asia: A Photographic Guide (1998). Out of print
- A Photographic Guide to the Birds of Southeast Asia (Tuttle Publishing, 2000).
- A Photographic Guide to the Birds of Indonesia (Tuttle Publishing, 2001; Second Edition, 2012; reprinted 2015).
- Birds of Rusinga Island Lodge (2003). Out of print
- Birds of Campi ya Kanzi (2003). Out of print
- Birds of Kilalinda Lodge (2003). Out of print
- Birds of Fraser's Hill (2004). Out of print
- Birds of Saruni Lodge (2004). Out of print
- Birds of Taman Negara (Nature's Niche, 2006).
- Colugo: The Flying Lemur of South-east Asia (edited, 2007).
- A Passion for Birds (edited, 2008). Out of print
- Wild Animals of Singapore (edited, 2008; updated edition, 2012).
- Hornbills of the World: A Photographic Guide (with Dr. Pilai Poonswad and Dr. Alan Kemp; Draco Publishing, 2013).
- Be Financially Free: How to become salary independent in today's economy (Marshall Cavendish, 2016; reprinted 2017, 2018).
- Be Financially Free, Complex Chinese (Domain Publishing Company, 2017).
- The Ethical Investor's Handbook: How to grow your money without wrecking the Earth (Marshall Cavendish, 2018).
- Are You Sustainable? Future-proofing your finances in the new economy of work (Marshall Cavendish, 2023).
