= Gordon Beruldsen =

Australian ornithologist

Gordon Ridley Beruldsen (1933–24 July 2007) was an Australian ornithologist and an expert on the nests and eggs of Australian birds. Beruldsen died in Brisbane, Queensland, after four years of illness with amyloidosis.

== Publications ==
As well as numerous papers in the ornithological literature, books authored by Beruldsen include:

- 1971 – Water Birds of Australia. Rigby: Adelaide.
- 1972 – Larger Land Birds of Australia. Rigby: Adelaide.
- 1972 – Smaller Land Birds of Australia. Rigby: Adelaide.
- 1980 – A Field Guide to Nests and Eggs of Australian Birds. Rigby: Adelaide. ISBN 0-7270-1202-9
- 1995 – Which Bird of Prey is That? A field guide to the identification of Australian birds of prey. Author:Brisbane. ISBN 0-646-26443-5
- 2003 – Australian Birds their nests and eggs. Author: Kenmore Hills, Queensland. ISBN 0-646-42798-9
