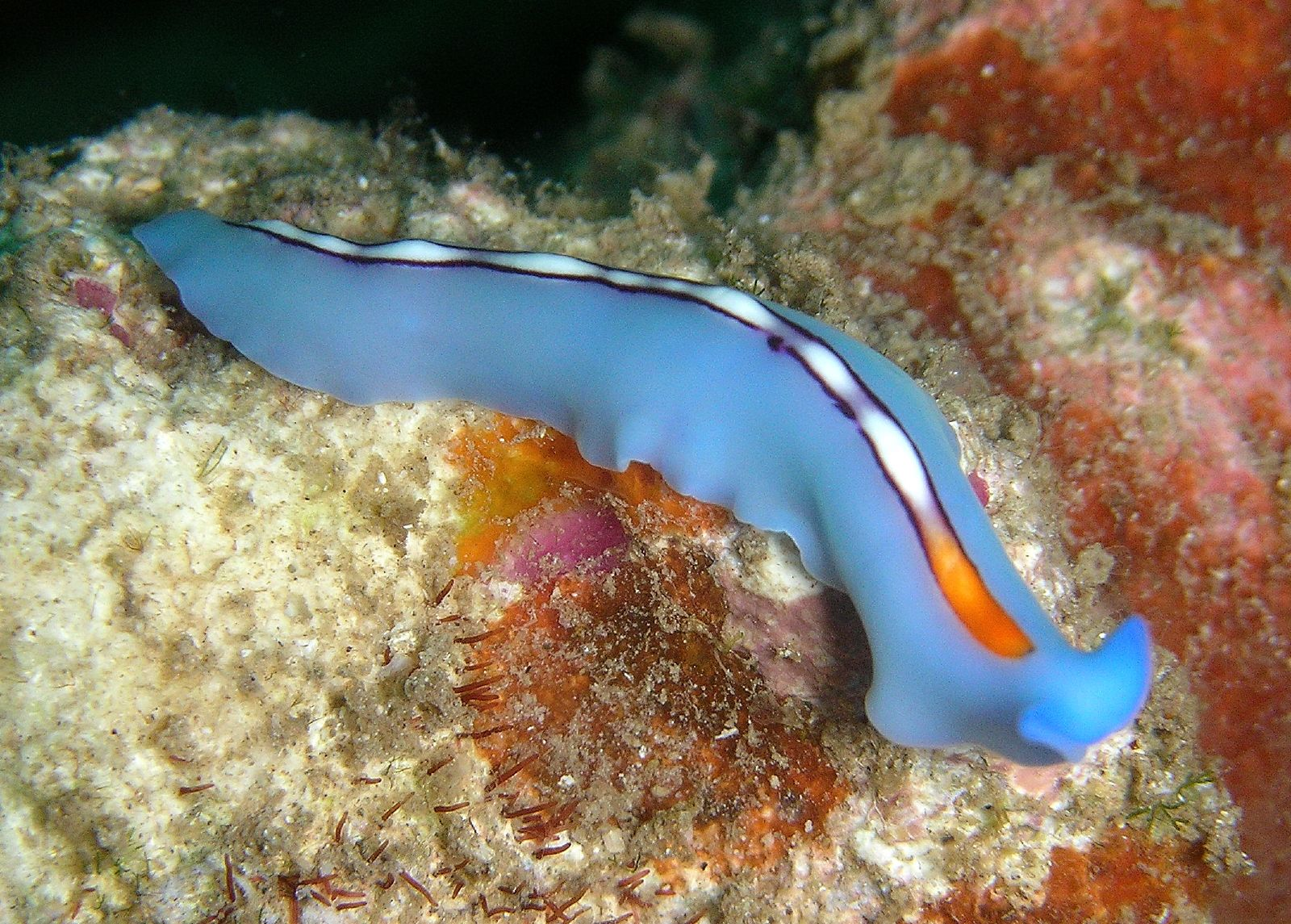
- Pseudoceros liparus

Scientific classification
- Kingdom: Animalia
- Phylum: Platyhelminthes
- Order: Polycladida
- Suborder: Cotylea
- Family: Pseudocerotidae
- Genus: Pseudoceros; Lang, 1884

= Pseudoceros =

Genus of flatworms

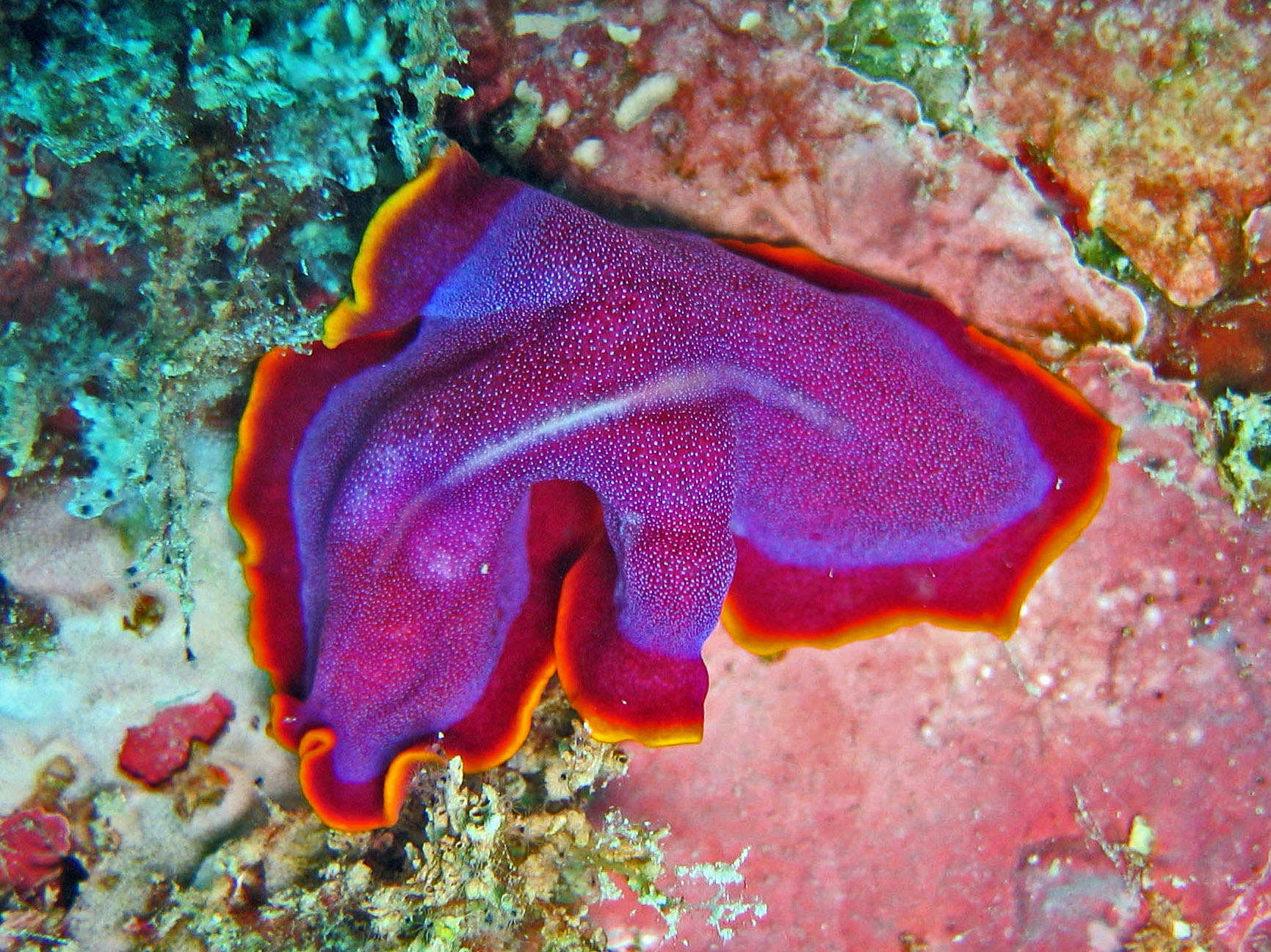
Pseudoceros ferrugineus

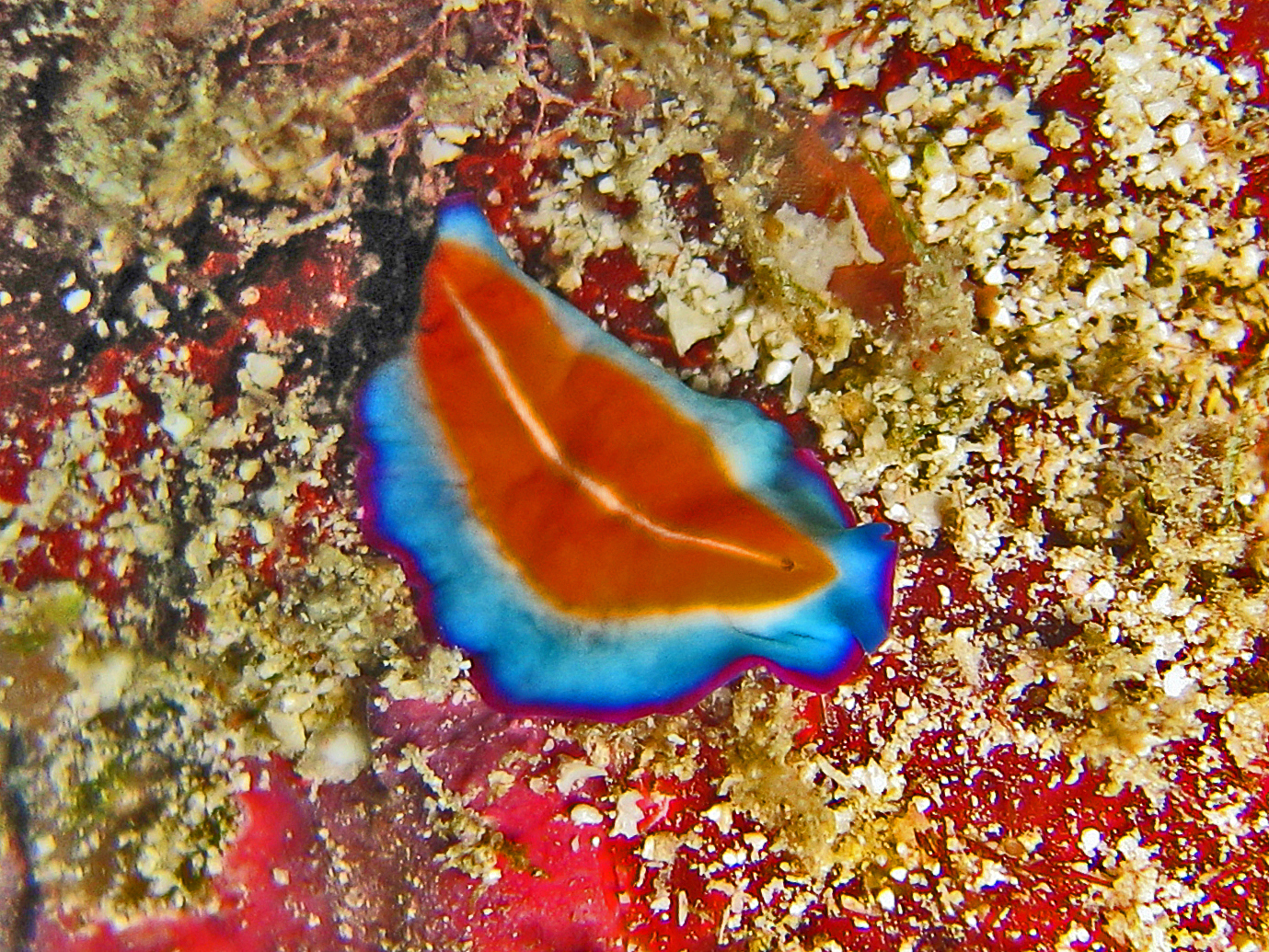
Pseudoceros susanae

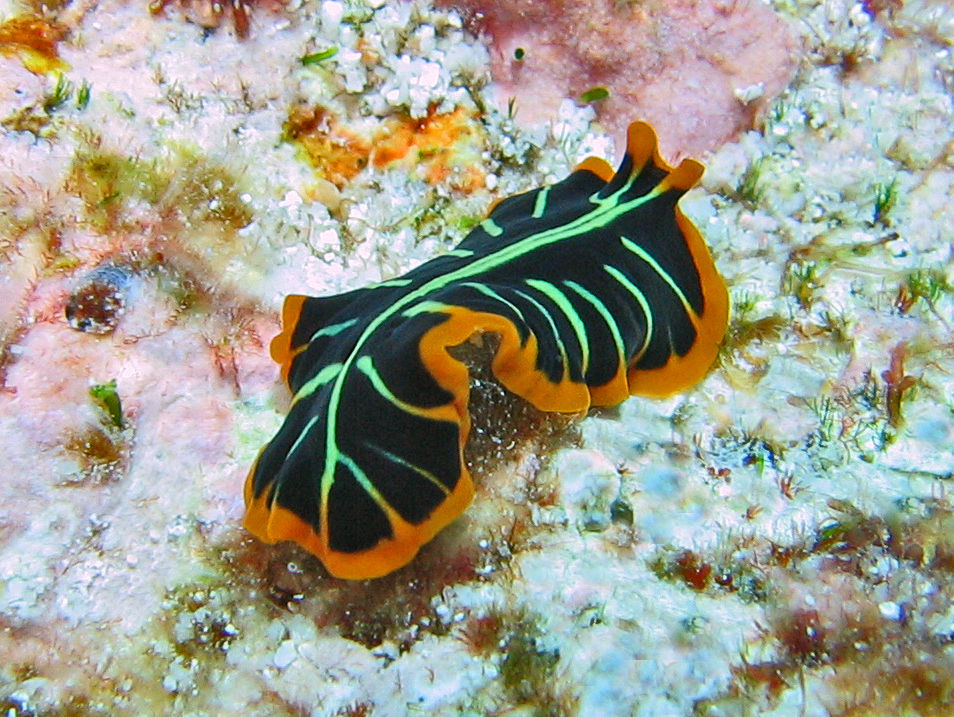
Pseudoceros dimidiatus

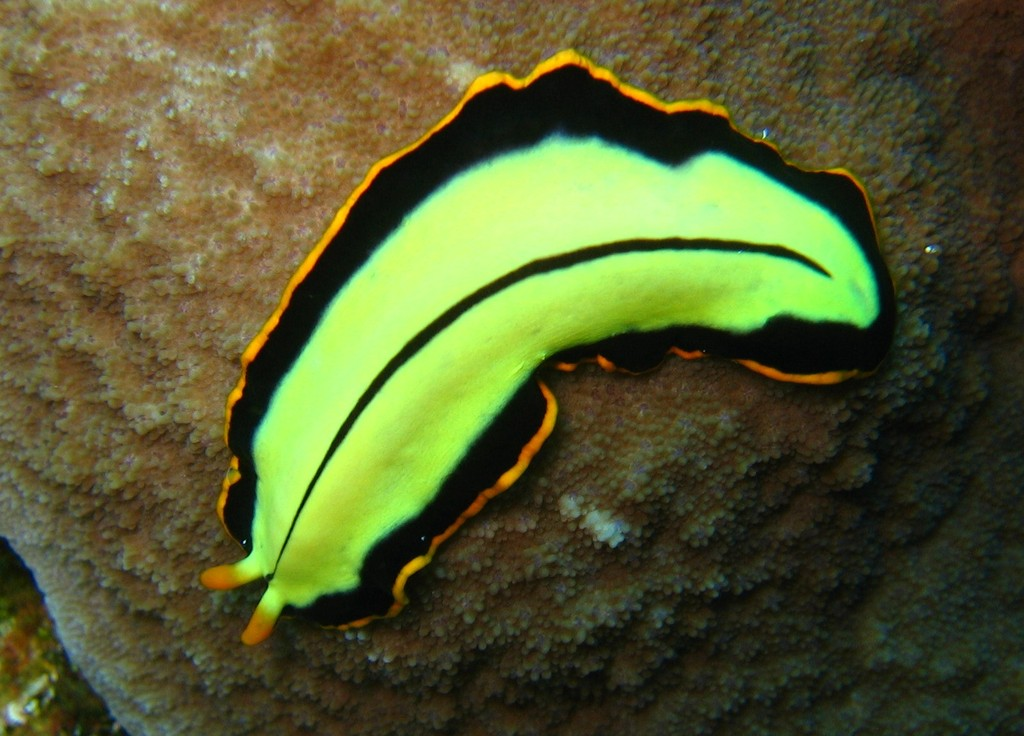
Pseudoceros dimidiatus

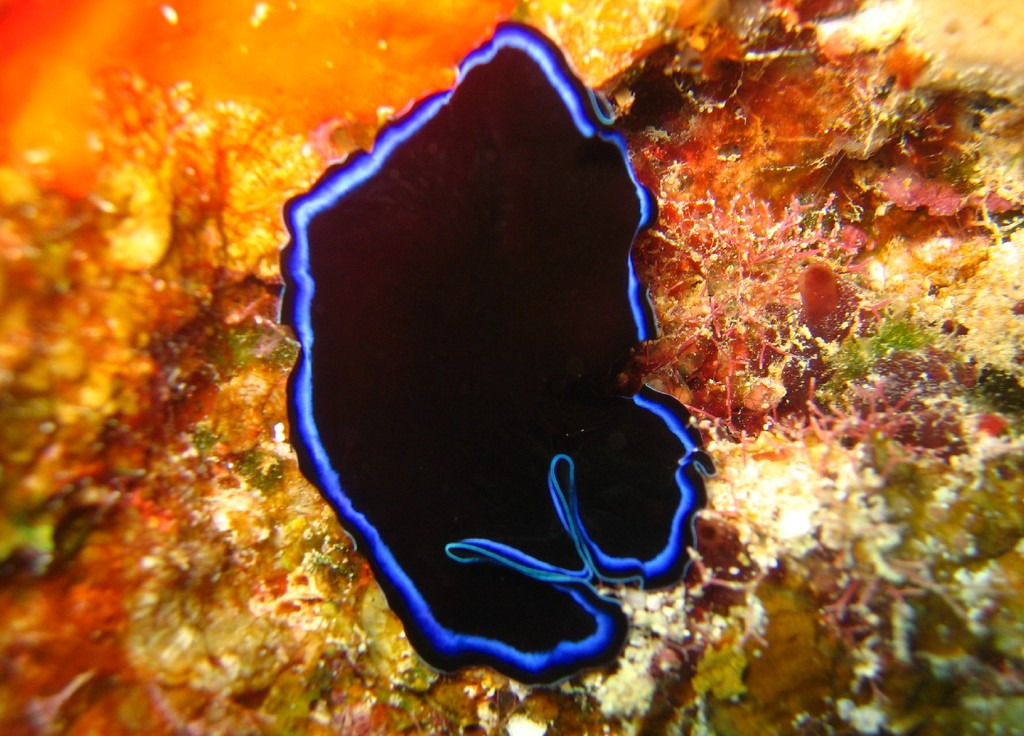
Pseudoceros sapphirinus

Pseudoceros is a genus of the flatworms Platyhelminthes.

== Description ==
Easily recognized features within the genus include a ruffled pharynx, branched intestines, and tentacles on the leading edge. The tentacles may act as chemoreceptors and may also have primitive eyes, simple light-sensitive cells, on them. The Polyclad worms are acoelomates and bilaterally symmetrical.

Color is the main identifier within the family Pseudocerotidae to separate it into genera, as it can be difficult to distinguish internal reproductive anatomy between genera. Because of the similarities in body plan and structure, it is assumed that chemical cues are how these organisms can recognize their own species and differentiate between others.

The intense coloring and patterning on these flatworms could be used to camouflage with their surroundings, confuse and elude predators, to communicate with other members of the species, or as aposematism to warn predators of their deadly toxins. The cells and the pigments they contain that are responsible for this coloring have not been well-studied, but one common theory is that they may be ommochrome pigments, although no discoveries have been made to prove this.

== Distribution ==
Pseudoceros are generally found in tropical and subtropical waters. They are populous in the Indo-Pacific region and have been found as far north as Puget Sound, where Pseudoceros canadensis has been identified, but mostly tend to stay in warmer waters.

== Reproduction ==
Pseudoceros are simultaneous hermaphrodites and reproduce sexually via random hypodermic insemination through the body tissue. These organisms participate in penis fencing, which is a behavior where the flatworms use their extended penises to stab and inseminate the other, while avoiding becoming inseminated themselves. After successful fertilization, these flatworms are known to lay egg masses on the benthos. Numbers of eggs, egg size, and developmental time vary between species.

Pseudoceros indicus will display parental care in the form of brooding activity. Pseudoceros will hatch into Muller's larvae and undergo indirect development and metamorphosis before becoming an adult organism.

== History & taxonomy ==
Historically, studying flatworms has been a time and labor-intensive job, generally done through live drawings of specimens, preservation of hard parts (which led to the loss of important information pertaining to the soft parts), and very detailed anatomical studies based on serial sections. More recent technological advances have allowed for scientists to combine photomicrography with molecular analyses to more easily study these organisms.

There is currently no consensus on what the best method of identification for Pseudoceros is. The two main theories are that species can be identified solely based on their color patterns and that species should be identified based on their reproductive organs instead of coloration. Because of this, identification methods vary within the biological community.

In concordance with the theory that species should be identified based on color patterns, a new method for preserving Pseudoceros samples was developed in 1995 by Cannon and Newman. This method utilizes FCA-PGPP, or Formaldehyde Calcium Acetate-Propylene Glycol, Propylene Phenoxetol, as the fixative. The worms are placed onto filter paper which is placed on top of a frozen layer of the fixative, and this preserves color accurately.

As of 2000, there are 13 genera in the family Pseudocerotidae that comprise an estimated at least 500 species, of which the genus Pseudoceros made up about 75% until the genus Pseudobiceros was separated.

=== Species ===
The following species are recognised in the genus Pseudoceros:

- Pseudoceros affinis (Collingwood, 1876)
- Pseudoceros agattiensis Dixit, 2019
- Pseudoceros albicornus (Stimpson, 1857)
- Pseudoceros albomarginatus Hyman, 1959
- Pseudoceros asamusiensis Kato, 1939
- Pseudoceros astrorum Bulnes & Torres, 2014
- Pseudoceros ater Hyman, 1959
- Pseudoceros atraviridis (Collingwood, 1876)
- Pseudoceros atropurpureus Kato, 1934
- Pseudoceros auranticrinis Dixit, Raghunathan & Chandra, 2017
- Pseudoceros bicolor Verrill, 1902
- Pseudoceros bicuti Ramos-Sanchez, Bahia & Rolando Bastida-Zavala, 2020
- Pseudoceros bifasciatus Prudhoe, 1989
- Pseudoceros bimarginatus Meixner, 1907
- Pseudoceros bipurpureus Dixit, 2021
- Pseudoceros bolool Newman & Cannon, 1994
- Pseudoceros buskii (Collingwood, 1876)
- Pseudoceros caeruleocinctus Hyman, 1959
- Pseudoceros caeruleopunctatus Palombi, 1928
- Pseudoceros canadensis Hyman, 1953
- Pseudoceros cardinalis Haswell, 1907
- Pseudoceros cardiosorus (Schmarda, 1859)
- Pseudoceros cerebralis (Kelaart, 1858)
- Pseudoceros chloreus Marcus, 1949
- Pseudoceros clavicornis (Schmarda, 1859)
- Pseudoceros coccineus (Stimpson, 1857)
- Pseudoceros colemani Prudhoe, 1977
- Pseudoceros collingwoodi Laidlaw, 1903
- Pseudoceros concinnus (Collingwood, 1876)
- Pseudoceros confusus Newman & Cannon, 1995
- Pseudoceros contrarius Newman & Cannon, 1995
- Pseudoceros corallophilus Hyman, 1954
- Pseudoceros cruentus Newman & Cannon, 1998
- Pseudoceros devisii Woodworth, 1898
- Pseudoceros dimidiatus von Graff, 1893
- Pseudoceros dulcis Kelaart, 1858
- Pseudoceros duplicinctus Prudhoe, 1989
- Pseudoceros exoptatus Kato, 1938
- Pseudoceros felis Newman & Cannon, 1994
- Pseudoceros ferrugineus (Hyman, 1959)
- Pseudoceros flavomaculatus Graff, 1893
- Pseudoceros flavomarginatus Laidlaw, 1902
- Pseudoceros fulminatus (Stimpson, 1855)
- Pseudoceros fuscogriseus Hyman, 1959
- Pseudoceros fuscopunctatus Prudhoe, 1977
- Pseudoceros fuscus (Kelaart, 1858)
- Pseudoceros galatheensis Dixit, Raghunathan & Chandra, 2017
- Pseudoceros galaxea Dixit, 2021
- Pseudoceros gamblei Laidlaw, 1902
- Pseudoceros glaucus Prudhoe, 1989
- Pseudoceros goslineri Newman & Cannon, 1994
- Pseudoceros gravieri Meixner, 1907
- Pseudoceros griseus Hyman, 1959
- Pseudoceros guttatomarginatus (Stimpson, 1855)
- Pseudoceros habroptilus Hyman, 1959
- Pseudoceros haddoni (Laidlaw, 1903)
- Pseudoceros hancockanus (Collingwood, 1876)
- Pseudoceros harrisi Bolanos, Quiroga, & Litvaitis, 2007
- Pseudoceros heronensis Newman & Cannon, 1994
- Pseudoceros imitatus Newman & Cannon, 1994
- Pseudoceros imperatus Newman & Cannon, 1998
- Pseudoceros indicus Newman & Schupp, 2002
- Pseudoceros intermittus Newman & Cannon, 1995
- Pseudoceros interruptus (Stimpson, 1855)
- Pseudoceros irretitus Newman & Cannon, 1998
- Pseudoceros japonicus (Stimpson, 1857)
- Pseudoceros jebborum Newman & Cannon, 1994
- Pseudoceros josei Newman & Cannon, 1998
- Pseudoceros juani Bahia et al., 2014
- Pseudoceros kelaarti (Collingwood, 1876)
- Pseudoceros kentii Graff, 1893
- Pseudoceros kylie Newman & Cannon, 1998
- Pseudoceros lacteus (Collingwood, 1876)
- Pseudoceros lactolimbus Newman & Cannon, 1998
- Pseudoceros laingensis Newman & Cannon, 1998
- Pseudoceros langamaakensis Faubel, 1983
- Pseudoceros laticlavus Newman & Cannon, 1994
- Pseudoceros latissimus type A (Schmarda, 1859)
- Pseudoceros leptostictus Bock, 1913
- Pseudoceros limbatus Leuckart, 1828
- Pseudoceros lindae Newman & Cannon, 1994
- Pseudoceros liparus Marcus, 1950
- Pseudoceros litoralis Bock, 1913
- Pseudoceros lividus Prudhoe, 1982
- Pseudoceros luteus (Plehn, 1898)
- Pseudoceros macroceraeus Schmarda, 1859
- Pseudoceros maculatus (Pease, 1860)
- Pseudoceros maximum Lang, 1884
- Pseudoceros maximus-type A Lang, 1884
- Pseudoceros meenae Dixit, Sivaperuman & Raghunathan, 2018
- Pseudoceros memoralis Kato, 1938
- Pseudoceros mexicanus Hyman, 1953
- Pseudoceros microceraeus (Schmarda, 1859)
- Pseudoceros micropapillosus Kato, 1934
- Pseudoceros monostichos Newman & Cannon, 1994
- Pseudoceros montereyensis Hyman, 1953
- Pseudoceros mossambicus Prudhoe, 1989
- Pseudoceros mulleri (Delle Chiaje, 1829)
- Pseudoceros niger (Stimpson, 1857)
- Pseudoceros nigrocinctus (Schmarda, 1859)
- Pseudoceros nigropunctatus Dixit, Raghunathan & Chandra, 2017
- Pseudoceros nipponicus Kato, 1944
- Pseudoceros ouini Newman & Cannon, 1994
- Pseudoceros paradoxus Bock, 1927
- Pseudoceros paralaticlavus Newman & Cannon, 1994
- Pseudoceros periaurantius Newman & Cannon, 1994
- Pseudoceros periphaeus Bock, 1913
- Pseudoceros peripurpureus Newman & Cannon, 1994
- Pseudoceros perviolaceus (Schmarda, 1859)
- Pseudoceros pius Kato, 1938
- Pseudoceros pleurostictus Bock, 1913
- Pseudoceros punctatus Laidlaw, 1902
- Pseudoceros purpureus (Kelaart, 1858)
- Pseudoceros rawlinsonae Bolanos, Quiroga, & Litvaitis, 2007
- Pseudoceros regalus Laidlaw, 1903
- Pseudoceros reticulatus Yeri & Kaburaki, 1918
- Pseudoceros rubellus Laidlaw, 1903
- Pseudoceros rubronanus Newman & Cannon, 1998
- Pseudoceros rubrotentaculatus Kaburaki, 1923
- Pseudoceros sagamianus Kato, 1937
- Pseudoceros sapphirinus Newman & Cannon, 1994
- Pseudoceros scintillatus Newman & Cannon, 1994
- Pseudoceros scriptus Newman & Cannon, 1998
- Pseudoceros stellans Dixit, 2019
- Pseudoceros stimpsoni Newman & Cannon, 1998
- Pseudoceros striatus Kelaart, 1858
- Pseudoceros susanae Newman & Anderson, 1997
- Pseudoceros texanus Hyman, 1955
- Pseudoceros tigrinus Laidlaw, 1902
- Pseudoceros tomiokaensis Kato, 1938
- Pseudoceros tristriatus Hyman, 1959
- Pseudoceros velutinus (Blanchard, 1847)
- Pseudoceros verecundus Newman & Cannon, 1994
- Pseudoceros vinosus Meixner, 1907
- Pseudoceros vishnui Dixit, Raghunathan & Chandra, 2017
- Pseudoceros yessoensis Kato, 1937
- Pseudoceros zebra (Leuckart, 1828)
- Pseudoceros zeylanicus (Kelaart, 1858)
