= Pseudoceros canadensis =

Scientific classification
- Kingdom: Animalia
- Phylum: Platyhelminthes
- Order: Polycladida
- Suborder: Cotylea
- Family: Pseudocerotidae
- Genus: Pseudoceros
- Species: P. canadensis

Binomial name
- Pseudoceros canadensis Hyman

Species of flatworm

Pseudoceros canadensis, commonly known as the Puget flatworm, is a species of free-living flatworm in the genus Pseudoceros, belonging to the family Pseudocerotidae.

== Physical characteristics ==
These flatworms are acoelomate bilaterians. They lack respiratory and circulatory systems and therefore diffuse oxygen and CO_{2} through the body surface, which is made possible due to them being highly flattened, which increases their surface area to volume ratio. However, this limits their maximum in size. They possess digestive systems, which allows them to process complex dietary items. They possess a protrusible pharynx to collect food.

Platyhelminthes have a high degree of cephalization with an obvious head-end. Pseudoceros have a distinctive anterior folding of the body to make 2 tentacles known as "false horns".

== Vision ==
The right cerebral eye of the larval stage has 1 cup-shaped pigment cell & 3 sensory cells that have microvilli. The left eye of the larval stage is composed the same with the exception of an additional sensory cell containing multiple cilia. The epidermal ocellus of the larval stage is composed of a cup-shaped pigment cell containing flattened cilia and photoreceptors and a cell above the cup that contains noncilliar lamellae. The eyes of the adult stage only contain microvillar receptors.

== Movement ==
Members of the class Turbellaria are covered in cilia that allows for movement. They secrete a mucus and beat ventral cilia within the mucus to move along a ventral surface. They can also move through a series of pedal waves, which is when the ventral surface contracts in waves along the body, propelling the organism forward.

== Reproduction ==
Pseudoceros canadensis are simultaneous hermaphrodites that use a form of hypodermic insemination known as penis fencing to determine which breeding partner is the female, and which is the male. Gametes are passed from the victorious male into the female by puncturing the body wall and injecting them with gametes. After fertilization, eggs are laid and develop into Muller's larvae (a free-swimming larval stage).

== Distribution ==
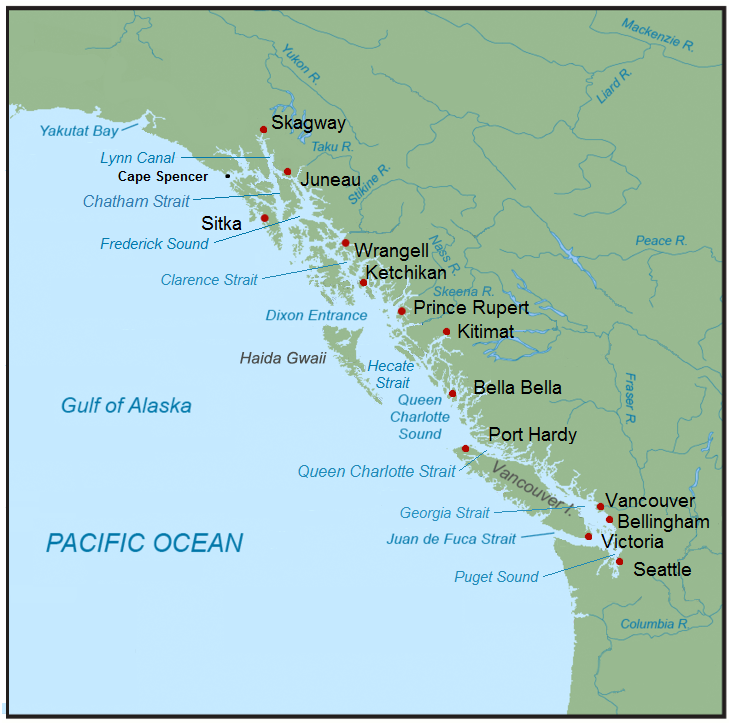
Map of the western coast of North America showing the range from Puget Sound to British Columbia

Unlike other species of the genus Pseudoceros, Pseudoceros canadensis is found in colder waters. It lives within the range of the Puget Sound, which is an inlet in the Pacific Ocean located along the northwestern coast of the US state of Washington, and British Columbia (Northwesternmost Province of Canada).

== Diet ==
Adults are known to eat ascidians, or sea squirts. Eating is aided by the use of a protrusible pharynx located on the anterior of the organism. In the Muller's larval stage they have been found to eat microalgae using ciliary beat reversal to alter near-field flow and draw in food particles toward the mouth.
