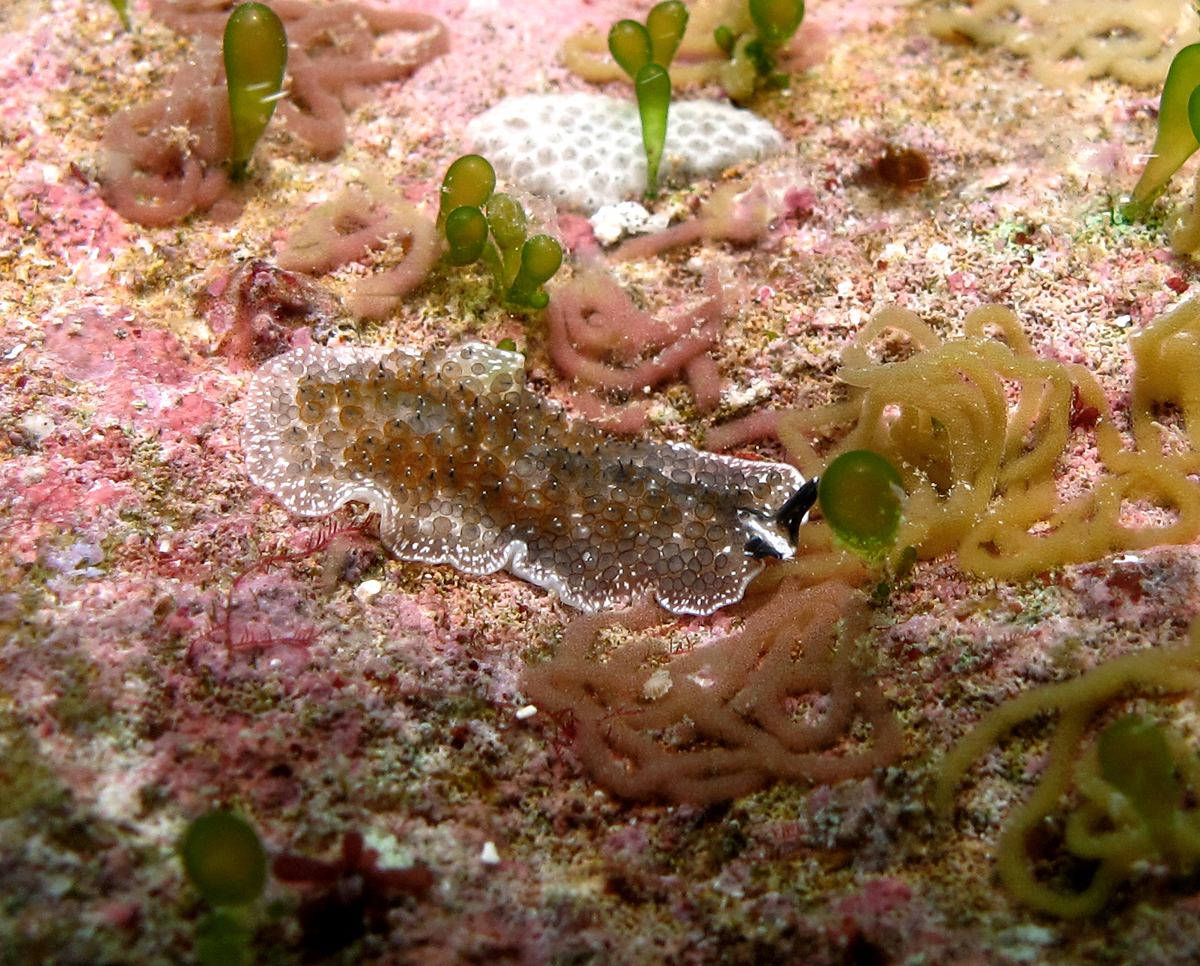

Scientific classification
- Kingdom: Animalia
- Phylum: Platyhelminthes
- Order: Polycladida
- Family: Pseudocerotidae
- Genus: Acanthozoon; Collingwood, 1876

= Acanthozoon =

Genus of flatworms

Acanthozoon is a genus of polyclad flatworms belonging to the family Pseudocerotidae.

== Description ==
The genus Acanthozoon is physically characterized by a dorsal side with small raised papillae and ruffled edges. Their body is elongate oval. The species of this genus have a complex and very folded pharynx. They also have small pseudo-tentacles that prick up like ears. Because of their papillated upper surface, they are easily confused with species from the genus Thysanozoon, which are also endowed with dorsal papillae. However Acanthozoon possess only a single male copulative organ contrary to Thysanozoon.

== Biology ==
This genus live in warm tropical marine waters. They are benthic and carnivorous.

== Species list ==
The following species are recognised in the genus Acanthozoon:

- Acanthozoon albopapillosum Hyman, 1959
- Acanthozoon albopunctatum Prudhoe, 1977
- Acanthozoon alderi (Collingwood, 1876)
- Acanthozoon allmani (Collingwood, 1876)
- Acanthozoon aranfaibo Cuadrado, Moro & Norena, 2017
- Acanthozoon armatum (Kelaart, 1858)
- Acanthozoon auropunctatum (Kelaart, 1858)
- Acanthozoon boehmigi (Stummer-Traunfels, 1895)
- Acanthozoon fuscobulbosum Dixit, Sivaperuman & Raghunathan, 2018
- Acanthozoon hispidum (Du Bois-Reymond Marcus, 1955)
- Acanthozoon indicum (Plehn, 1896)
- Acanthozoon lepidum (Heath & McGregor, 1912)
- Acanthozoon maculosum (Pearse, 1938)
- Acanthozoon marginatum (Plehn, 1896)
- Acanthozoon obscurum (Stummer-Traunfels, 1895)
- Acanthozoon ovale (Schmarda, 1859)
- Acanthozoon papilionis (Kelaart, 1858)
- Acanthozoon plehni (Laidlaw, 1902)
- Acanthozoon semperi (Stummer-Traunfels, 1895)
