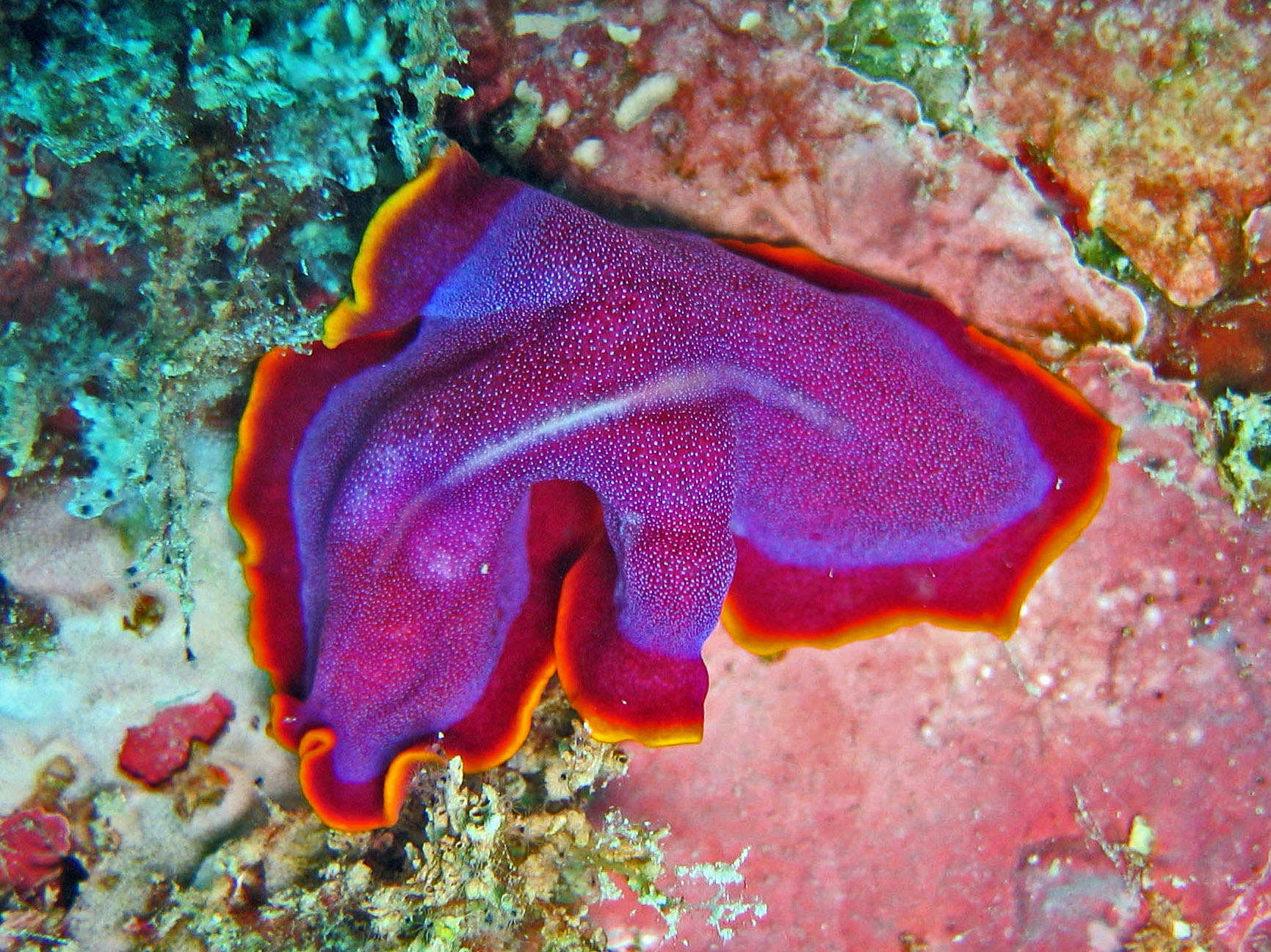
- Pseudoceros ferrugineus in Borneo

Scientific classification
- Kingdom: Animalia
- Phylum: Platyhelminthes
- Order: Polycladida
- Suborder: Cotylea
- Family: Pseudocerotidae
- Genus: Pseudoceros
- Species: P. ferrugineus

Binomial name
- Pseudoceros ferrugineus (Hyman, 1959)

= Pseudoceros ferrugineus =

Species of flatworm

Pseudoceros ferrugineus, the Fuchsia flatworm, is a marine flatworm species that belongs to the Pseudocerotidae family.

== Description ==
Pseudoceros ferrugineus can reach a length of about 18–48 mm. It has an enlarged oval shape. The upper surface of the body is fuchsia (hence the common name) with small white dots and two marginal bands red and orange without dots.

== Morphology ==
"External anatomy: Large body with several marginal deep ruffles. The color is dark red with the dorsal surface covered by compacted small white dots given the appearance of a brilliant pink surface. There are not two marginal bands, red and orange without white dots. Ventrally, the color is red being more intense towards the margin. Pseudotentacles formed by simple broad folds of the anterior margin with numerous marginal eyes. Cerebral cluster made of a large number of eyespots. Small pharynx with elaborated folds.

"Internal anatomy: The male reproductive system consists of a branched vas deferens, a long seminal vesicle connected to a short ejaculatory duct, a small prostatic vesicle with two chambers, a muscular prostatic duct, and a small stylet housed in a shallow male antrum. The female system has a shallow antrum with a short vagina directed backwards surrounded by a thick and strong mass of cement gland on its first portion."

== Distribution ==
This species is widespread in the tropical Indo-Pacific, from the Indonesian Archipelagos to Central Great Barrier Reef in Australia, Palau in Micronesia, Philippines and the islands of Hawaii.

== Habitat ==
It can be found in the external slope or top coral reef, at a depth of 1–15 m.

== Behaviour and feeding ==
These flatworms are benthic and diurnal. Because of their aposematic colors, they have no fear to crawl around to feed. Pseudoceros ferrugineus feeds on various colonial ascidians.

== Bibliography ==
- Leslie Newman & Lester Cannon, "Marine Flatworms", CSIRO publishing, 2003,ISBN 0-643-06829-5
- Neville Coleman, "Marine life of Maldives", Atoll editions, 2004,ISBN 187-6410-361
- Andrea & Antonnella Ferrrari,"Macrolife", Nautilus publishing, 2003,ISBN 983-2731-00-3
