= Pseudoceros reticulatus =

Scientific classification
- Kingdom: Animalia
- Phylum: Platyhelminthes
- Order: Polycladida
- Suborder: Cotylea
- Family: Pseudocerotidae
- Genus: Pseudoceros
- Species: P. reticulatus

Binomial name
- Pseudoceros reticulatus (Yeri & Kaburaki, 1918)

Species of flatworm

Psedoceros reticulatus (commonly known as the mottled flatworm) is a hermaphroditic marine flatworm species that belongs to the Pseudocerotidae family.

== Size ==
On average, the flatworm is 1.4 in (3.6 cm) long and 0.8 in (2.0 cm) wide.

== Habitat and Distribution ==
The flatworm can be found in the seabed of tropical oceans such as the Indian Ocean and the Pacific Ocean.

== Reproduction ==
As a hermaphrodite, the mottled flatworm reproduces by laying eggs.

== Diet ==
The primary diet of the flatworm consists of dead bodies on the sea floor and smaller animals.
