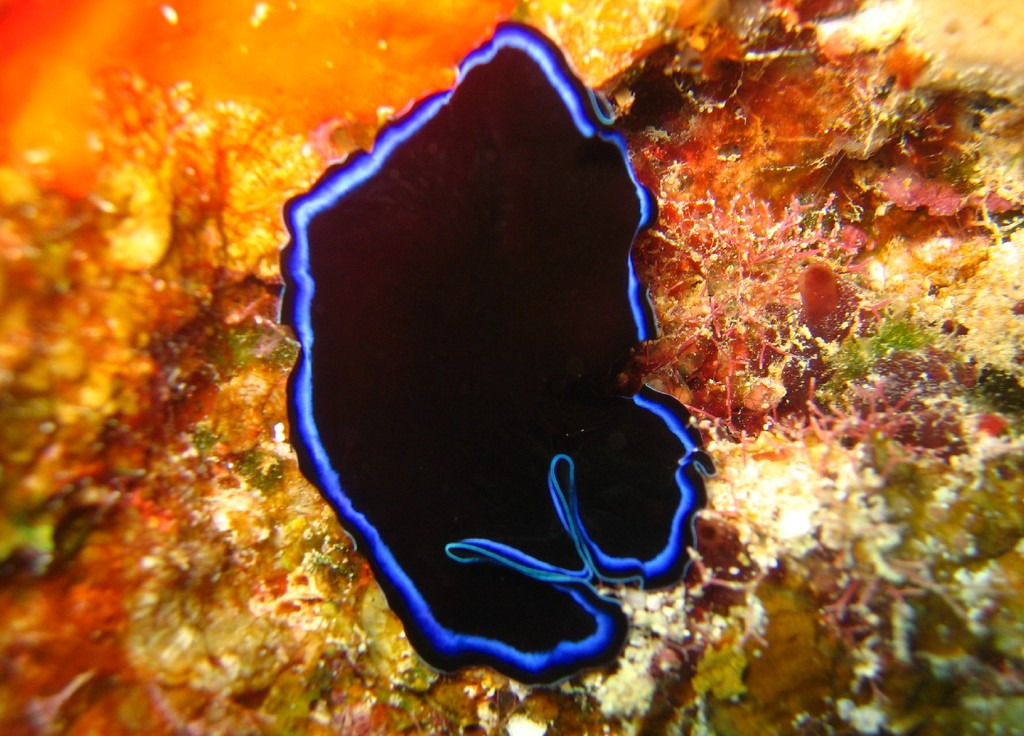

Scientific classification
- Kingdom: Animalia
- Phylum: Platyhelminthes
- Order: Polycladida
- Suborder: Cotylea
- Family: Pseudocerotidae
- Genus: Pseudoceros
- Species: P. sapphirinus

Binomial name
- Pseudoceros sapphirinus Newman and Cannon, 1994

= Pseudoceros sapphirinus =

Species of flatworm

Pseudoceros sapphirinus, known as the sapphire flatworm, is a species of flatworm in the family Pseudocerotidae. The species can be found in the waters of Queensland and Palau.
