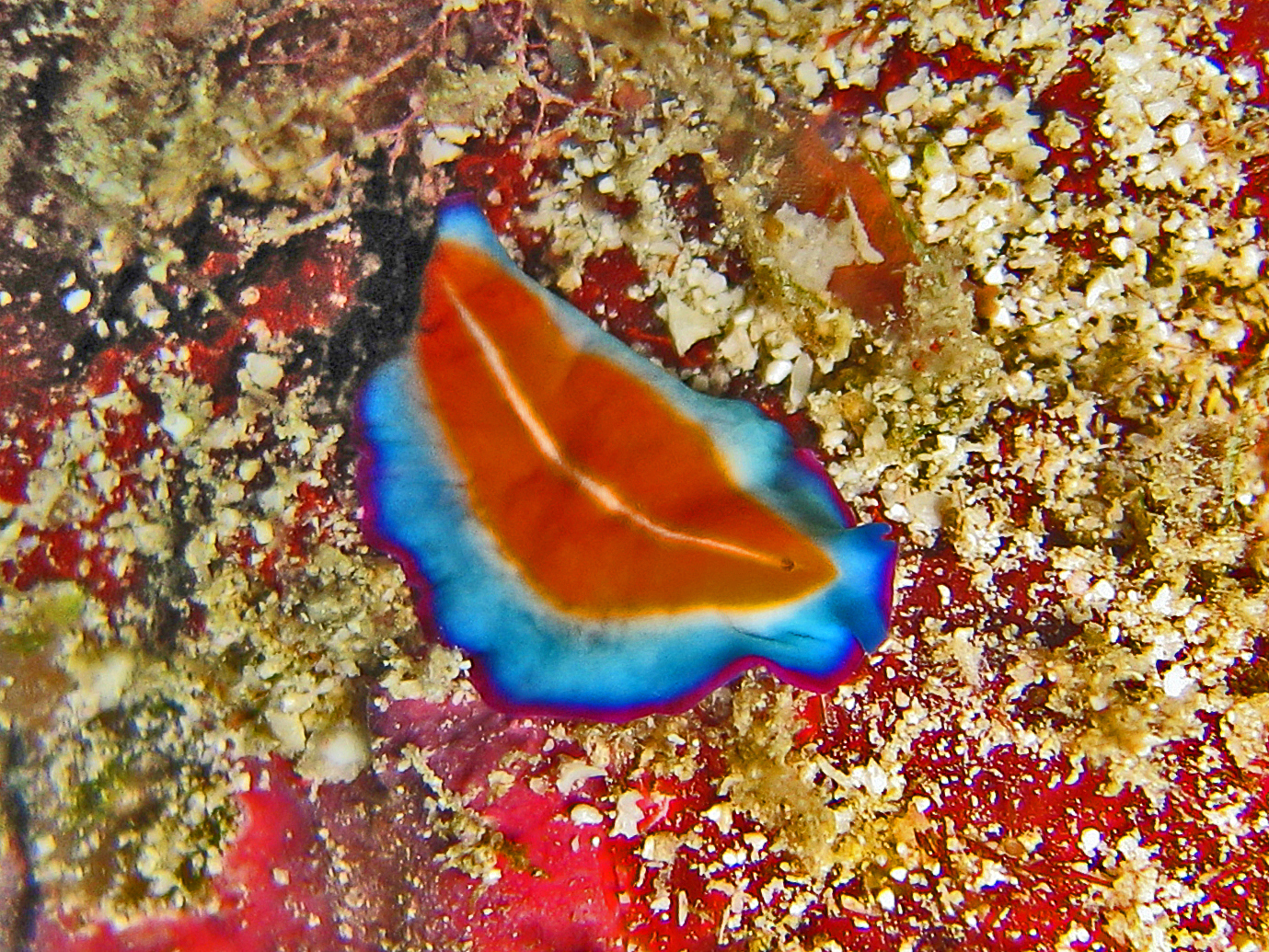
- A live individual of Pseudoceros susanae, in situ off Maldives

Scientific classification
- Kingdom: Animalia
- Phylum: Platyhelminthes
- Order: Polycladida
- Suborder: Cotylea
- Family: Pseudocerotidae
- Genus: Pseudoceros
- Species: P. susanae

Binomial name
- Pseudoceros susanae Newman & Anderson 1997

= Pseudoceros susanae =

Species of flatworm

Pseudoceros susanae is a marine flatworm species that belongs to the Pseudocerotidae family.

== Description ==
Pseudoceros susanae can reach a length of 35–55 mm. It has an enlarged oval shape. The upper surface of the body is orange-red, with a thin middle yellow line and two marginal bluish and violet bands.

== Distribution ==
This species can be found in the Indian Ocean and Maldives at a depth of about 15 m.

== Bibliography ==
- A new species and new records of Pseudoceros (Turbellaria, Polycladida) from the Maldives. Journal of South Asian Natural History, 2(2), March 1997: 247-255. [Zoological Record Volume 134]
