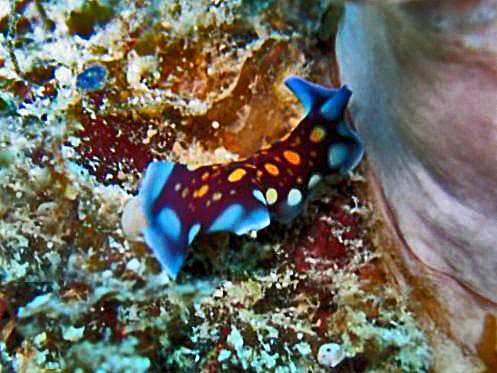
- A live individual of Pseudoceros lindae, in situ off Madagascar

Scientific classification
- Kingdom: Animalia
- Phylum: Platyhelminthes
- Order: Polycladida
- Suborder: Cotylea
- Family: Pseudocerotidae
- Genus: Pseudoceros
- Species: P. lindae

Binomial name
- Pseudoceros lindae (Newman & Cannon, 1994)

= Pseudoceros lindae =

Species of flatworm

Pseudoceros lindae, common name Linda's flatworm, is a marine Flatworm species that belongs to the Pseudocerotidae family.

== Description ==
Pseudoceros lindae can reach a length of 50–80 millimetres (2.0–3.1 in). The upper surface of the thick and elongated body shows a wine color (burgundy) background with turquoise margins and a variable number oval to round yellow-golden spots. This pattern may vary from one individual to another especially in the density of points. The ventral side is light purple. Each pseudotentacle is formed by a broad simple fold of the anterior margins of the body. Also pharynx is formed by highly elaborated folds. This species is a simultaneous hermaphrodite, so it can make cross fecundation. There is a single male reproductive organ, that penetrates in any part of the mate's body, and the females have a short vagina directed backwards.

== Behaviour and feeding ==
These flatworms are benthic and diurnals. Because of their aposematic colors, they have no fear to crawl around to feed. "Pseudoceros lindae" feeds on various colonial ascidians.

== Distribution ==
This species is widespread in the tropical Indo-Pacific, from Madagascar and the eastern coast of Africa to Indonesia, Philippines and the Great Barrier Reef of Australia.

== Habitat ==
It can be found in the external slope or top coral reef.

== Bibliography ==
- Leslie Newman & Lester Cannon, 1994 : Pseudoceros and Pseudobiceros (Platyhelminthes, Polycladida, Pseudocerotidae) from Eastern Australia and Papua New Guinea. Memoirs of the Queensland Museum, vol. 37, p. 205–266
- Leslie Newman & Lester Cannon, "Marine Flatworms", CSIRO publishing, 2003,ISBN 0-643-06829-5
- Neville Coleman, "Marine life of Maldives", Atoll editions, 2004,ISBN 187-6410-361
- Andrea & Antonnella Ferrrari,"Macrolife", Nautilus publishing, 2003,ISBN 983-2731-00-3
