= Pseudoceros galaxea =

Scientific classification
- Kingdom: Animalia
- Phylum: Platyhelminthes
- Order: Polycladida
- Suborder: Cotylea
- Family: Pseudocerotidae
- Genus: Pseudoceros
- Species: P. galaxea

Binomial name
- Pseudoceros galaxea Dixit, 2021

Species of flatworm from India

Pseudoceros galaxea is a species of marine polyclad flatworm in the family Pseudocerotidae. It is found in India.

== Description ==
P. galaxea is brown with white to cream dots on its dorsal surface.
