= Pseudoceros bicolor =

Scientific classification
- Domain: Eukaryota
- Kingdom: Animalia
- Phylum: Platyhelminthes
- Order: Polycladida
- Family: Pseudocerotidae
- Genus: Pseudoceros
- Species: P. bicolor

Binomial name
- Pseudoceros bicolor Verrill, 1901

Species of flatworm

Pseudoceros bicolor, known as the two-colored flatworm, is a rare species of polycladid flatworm.

== Reproduction ==
Two-colored flatworms have a simultaneous hermaphrodite quality that display hypodermic insemination, the reproductive mode of some organisms whereby gametes are passed to a mate by puncturing the body wall and injecting gametes.

== Distribution and habitat ==
Two-colored flatworms are found in Indian River Lagoon, Bird Island, Bermuda, Bocas del Toro, Panama, Curaçao, the Florida Keys, Santa Marta, Colombia, South Water Caye, and Belize. They prefer living in areas with coral rubble, which are full of life.

== Diet ==
Two-colored flatworms are predators. They prey on colonial ascidians.
