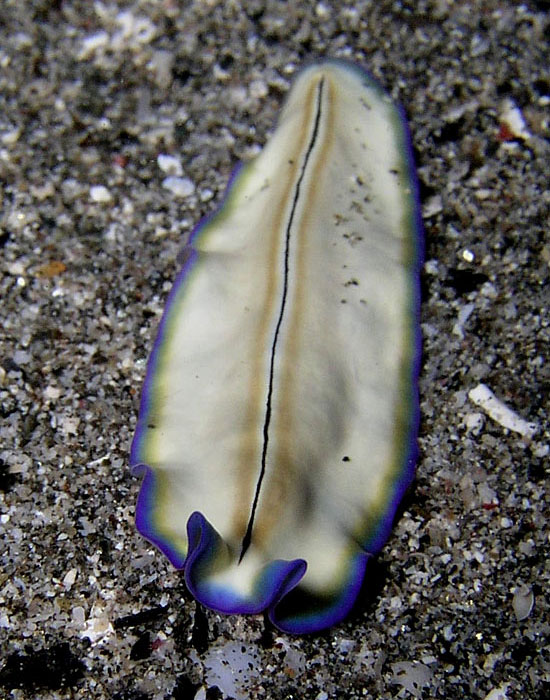

Scientific classification
- Kingdom: Animalia
- Phylum: Platyhelminthes
- Order: Polycladida
- Suborder: Cotylea
- Family: Pseudocerotidae
- Genus: Pseudoceros
- Species: P. monostichos

Binomial name
- Pseudoceros monostichos (Newman & Cannon, 1994)

= Pseudoceros monostichos =

Species of flatworm

Pseudoceros monostichos is a marine flatworm species that belongs to the Pseudocerotidae family.

== Common name ==
Fine-lined flatworm.

== Distribution ==
Tropical Indo-Pacific, from the Archipelago of Maldives to Australia.

== Habitat ==
External slope or top from coral reef.

== Size ==
Up to 2 inches (5.1 cm).

== Physical characteristics ==
"External anatomy: Body tapered posteriorly with a dorsal surface of an unusual dimpled texture. Cream background with a narrow black-brown longitudinal median line which doesn’t reach the anterior and posterior margins. This line is bordered by a white narrow band and surrounded by a light brown narrow band. There are four indistinct marginal bands; the inner one is yellow intensifying to green, then blue and a purple rim. The ventral side is cream with the same marginal bands and a median brown longitudinal stripe. The pseudotentacles are somewhat pointed formed by folds of the anterior margin. The cerebral cluster of eyes is obscured due to dark pigment of the median line. Ruffle pharynx with elaborated folds. Internal anatomy: The male apparatus is formed by a large seminal vesicle connected to an uncoiled ejaculatory duct, oval prostatic vesicle and a small stylet housed in a shallow and wide antrum. The female system is characterized by a shallow antrum with a short and muscular vagina surrounded by the cement glands."

== Behaviour ==
Benthic, diurnals, because of its aposematic colors, it has no fear to crawl around to feed.

== Feeding ==
Pseudoceros monostichos feeds on various colonial ascidians.
