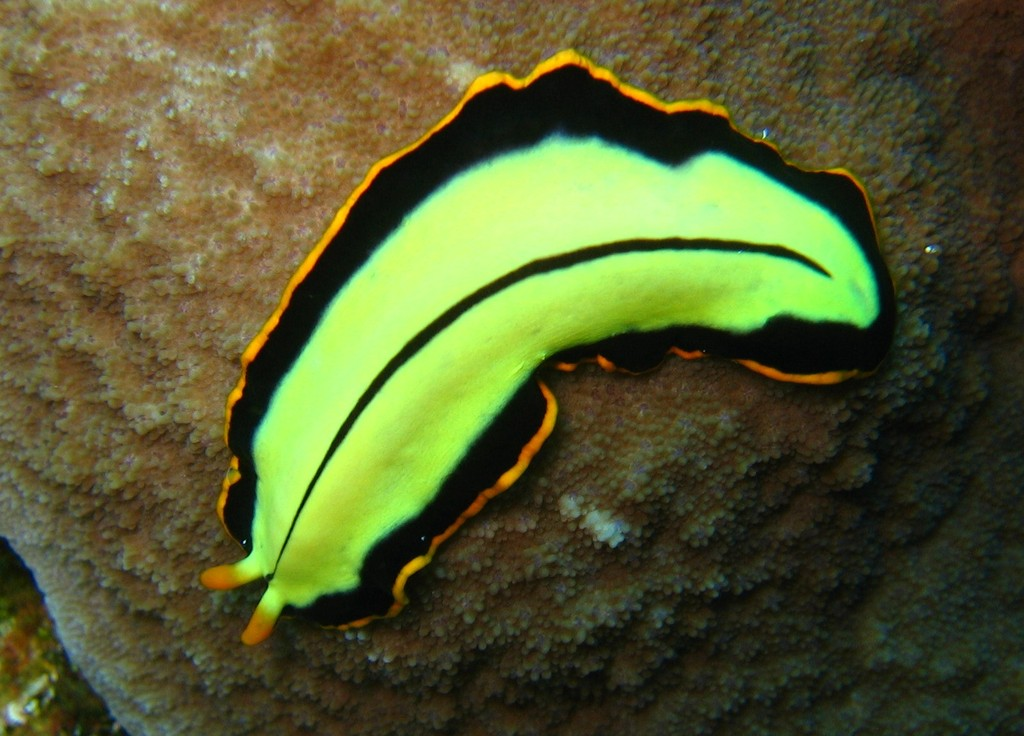

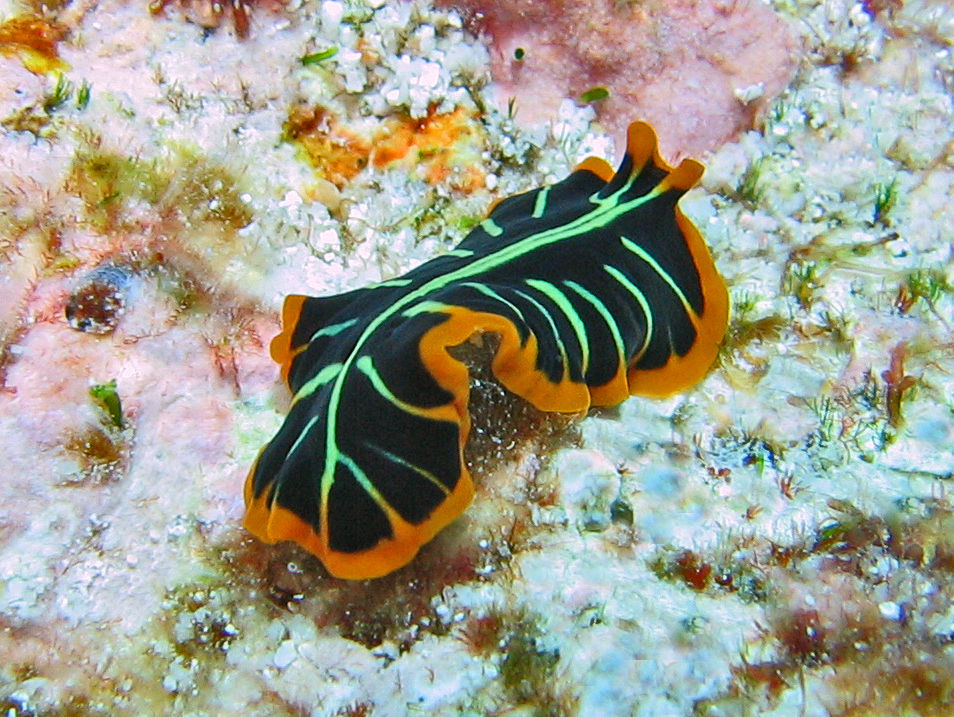
- Pseudoceros dimidiatus with a zebra pattern

Scientific classification
- Kingdom: Animalia
- Phylum: Platyhelminthes
- Order: Polycladida
- Suborder: Cotylea
- Family: Pseudocerotidae
- Genus: Pseudoceros
- Species: P. dimidiatus

Binomial name
- Pseudoceros dimidiatus von Graff in Kent, 1893

= Pseudoceros dimidiatus =

Species of flatworm

Pseudoceros dimidiatus, the divided flatworm or tiger flatworm, is a species of flatworm in the genus Pseudoceros, belonging to the family Pseudocerotidae.

== Description ==
Pseudoceros dimidiatus grows to be up to 8 centimetres (3.1 in). The body is elongated and oval, with a velvety dorsal surface, a grey-black ventral side and a black body with an orange marginal band and two yellow median stripes that vary from narrow to extremely wide, usually separated by a narrow black median line.

However, this species of Pseudoceros is highly variable in color and in pattern, in terms of the arrangement and width of the various transverse stripes and of the width of the longitudinal stripes. It can take at least three different types of liveries, all with the same colors, which threaten its being inedible. It has bilateral symmetry.

The bright and contrasting colours serve as a warning for predators to not eat this species. These flatworms feed exclusively on colonial ascidians. They are also cold blooded.

== Distribution ==
This species is widespread in the Indian Ocean from the Red Sea to Australia and in the Western Pacific Ocean.

== Reproduction ==
The divided flatworm can reproduce both asexually, by dividing itself, and sexually. The species is a hermaphrodite, meaning that they have both male and female reproductive organs. When two flatworms reproduce they battle to decide who gets to fertilize and who is fertilized. The winner gets to act as the male, fertilizing the other.

== Habitat ==
The divided flatworm lives in coral reefs in tropical waters.

== Original text ==
- Kent : The Great Barrier Reef of Australia; its products and potentialities. W.H. Allen, London (Full text).

== Bibliography ==
- Leslie Newman et Lester Cannon, Marine Flatworms, 2003 (ISBN 0-643-06829-5)
- Neville Coleman, La vie marine des Maldives, 2004 (ISBN 1-876410-54-X)
- http://diveadvisor.com/sub2o/fantastic-flatworms
- Marine Animal Encyclopedia - Divided Flatworms
- WoRMS
- Life Desk
- Discover Life
