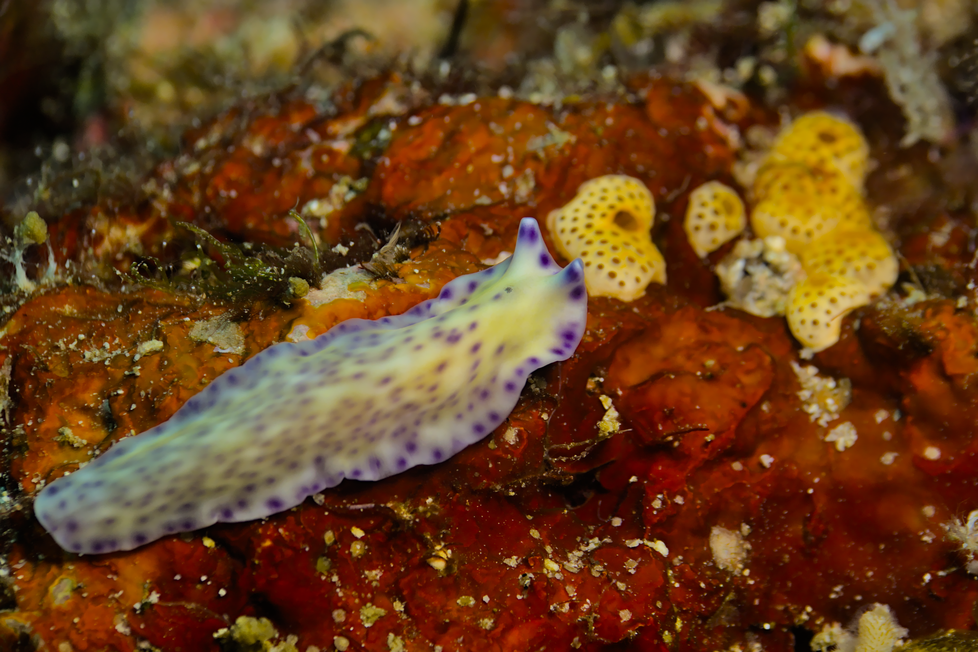

Scientific classification
- Kingdom: Animalia
- Phylum: Platyhelminthes
- Order: Polycladida
- Suborder: Cotylea
- Family: Pseudocerotidae
- Genus: Pseudoceros
- Species: P. laingensis

Binomial name
- Pseudoceros laingensis (Newman & Cannon, 1998)

= Pseudoceros laingensis =

Species of flatworm

Pseudoceros laingensis is a marine flatworm species that belongs to the Pseudocerotidae family.

== Common name ==
Flatworm of Laing : this name comes from the place it had been described the first time in Laing Island in Papua New Guinea.

== Distribution ==
Central Tropical Indo-Pacific, from Indonesia to Papua New Guinea.

== Habitat ==
External slope or top of coral reefs.

== Size ==
Up to 3 inches (7.6 cm).

== Physical characteristics ==
"External anatomy: Cream background with widely spaced scattered purple spots. Each spot is formed by microdots, denser in the middle with fine dots outwards. The ventral side is cream. Pseudotentacles are formed by simple folds of the anterior margin with small scattered pseudotentacular eyes on the margin. A horseshoe shaped cerebral cluster with about 100 eyespots. A big and wide pharynx formed by elaborated folds. Internal anatomy: The male system is formed by branched vas deferens, a rounded oblong seminal vesicle connected to a long and coiled ejaculatory duct, a large oval prostatic vesicle and a long pointed, and narrow cuticular stylet housed in a deep and voluminous antrum. The female antrum is deep and wide with a narrow and short vagina surrounded by the cement glands."

== Behaviour ==
Benthic, diurnals, because of its aposematic colors, it has no fear to crawl around to feed.

== Feeding ==
Pseudoceros laingensis feeds on various colonial ascidians.

== Bibliographical References ==
- Leslie Newman & Lester Cannon, "Marine Flatworms", CSIRO publishing, 2003,ISBN 0-643-06829-5
- Neville Coleman, "Marine life of Maldives", Atoll editions, 2004,ISBN 187-6410-361
- Andrea & Antonnella Ferrrari,"Macrolife", Nautilus publishing, 2003,ISBN 983-2731-00-3
