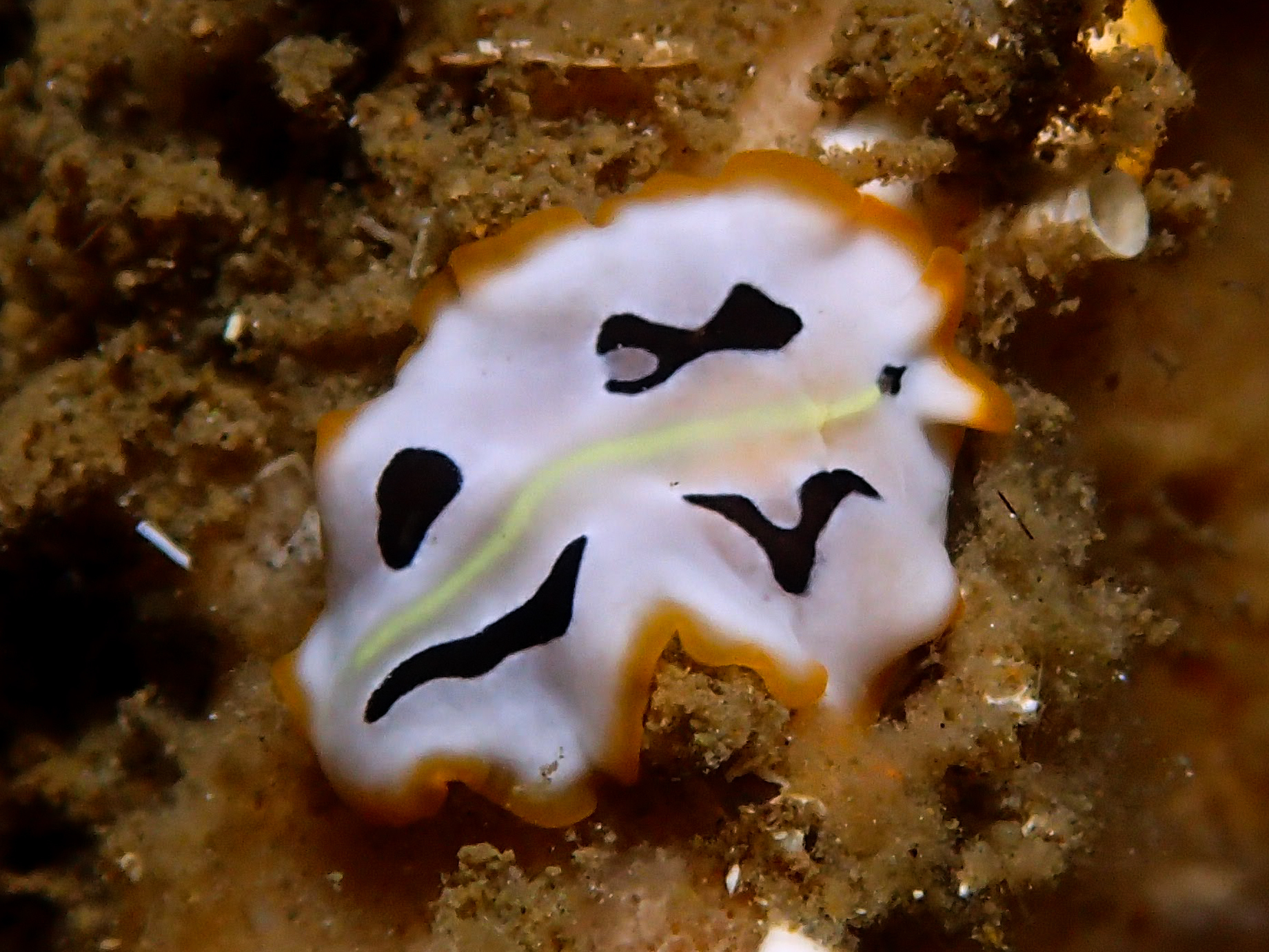

Scientific classification
- Kingdom: Animalia
- Phylum: Platyhelminthes
- Order: Polycladida
- Suborder: Cotylea
- Family: Pseudocerotidae
- Genus: Pseudoceros
- Species: P. scriptus

Binomial name
- Pseudoceros scriptus Newman & Cannon, 1998

= Pseudoceros scriptus =

Species of flatworm

Pseudoceros scriptus is a marine flatworm species that belongs to the Pseudocerotidae family. This species is commonly known as the script flatworm.

== Distribution ==
Tropical Indo-Pacific, from the Archipelago of Maldives to Australia.

== Habitat ==
External slope or top of coral reefs.

== Size ==
Up to 2 inches (5.1 cm).

== Physical characteristics ==
"External anatomy: Cream yellowish background fading to white towards the margin with irregular black maculae on either side of the median line and an orange marginal band. The ventral side is cream becoming darker towards the margin and a wide orange marginal band. The pseudotentacles are formed by simple folds of the anterior margin. Cerebral cluster with about 40 eyespots. Pharynx is formed by elaborated folds. Internal anatomy: The male system is formed by unbranched vas deferens, an oblong seminal vesicle, an oval prostatic vesicle, and a short cuticular stylet housed in a deep, folded, and voluminous antrum. The female antrum is shallow with a narrow and short vagina surrounded by the cement glands."

== Behaviour ==
Benthic, diurnals, because of its aposematic colors, it has no fear to crawl around to feed.

== Feeding ==
Pseudoceros scriptus feeds on various colonial ascidians.

== Bibliographical References ==
- Leslie Newman & Lester Cannon, "Marine Flatworms", CSIRO publishing, 2003,ISBN 0-643-06829-5
- Neville Coleman, "Marine life of Maldives", Atoll editions, 2004,ISBN 187-6410-361
- Andrea & Antonnella Ferrrari,"Macrolife", Nautilus publishing, 2003,ISBN 983-2731-00-3
