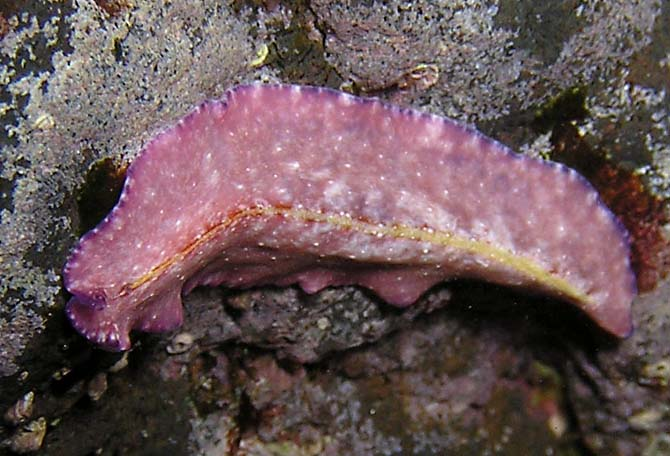

Scientific classification
- Kingdom: Animalia
- Phylum: Platyhelminthes
- Order: Polycladida
- Suborder: Cotylea
- Family: Pseudocerotidae
- Genus: Pseudoceros
- Species: P. goslineri

Binomial name
- Pseudoceros goslineri (Newman & Cannon, 1994)

= Pseudoceros goslineri =

Species of flatworm

Pseudoceros goslineri, the Gosliner flatworm, is a marine flatworm species that belongs to the family Pseudocerotidae.

== Distribution ==
It is found in the tropical Indo-Pacific, from the eastern coast of Africa to the Micronesia, including the Red Sea.

== Habitat ==
External slope or top on coral reef.

== Size ==
Up to 2 inches (5.1 cm).

== Physical characteristics ==
"External anatomy: Flatworm with irregular and variable color pattern characterized mainly by a cream background mottled with orange, and pink and purple-red dots concentrated medially forming an elongated blotch. The margin consists of purple and pink irregular spots and dots that are more concentrated on the tentacles making the tips a little darker. The ventral side is light violet. Pseudotentacles formed by simple folds of the anterior margin with few marginal eyes. Cerebral cluster made of about 30 eyespots. Presence of a broad folded pharynx. Internal anatomy: The male reproductive system consists of unbranched vas deferens, an elongated seminal vesicle connected to a short and coiled ejaculatory duct, a round prostatic vesicle, and a small stylet housed in a deep antrum. The female system has a deep and tubular female antrum with curved cement pouches and a short vagina directed backwards and surrounded by the cement gland."

== Behaviour ==
Benthic, diurnals, because of its aposematic colors, it has no fear to crawl around to feed.

== Feeding ==
Pseudoceros goslineri feeds on various colonial ascidians.
