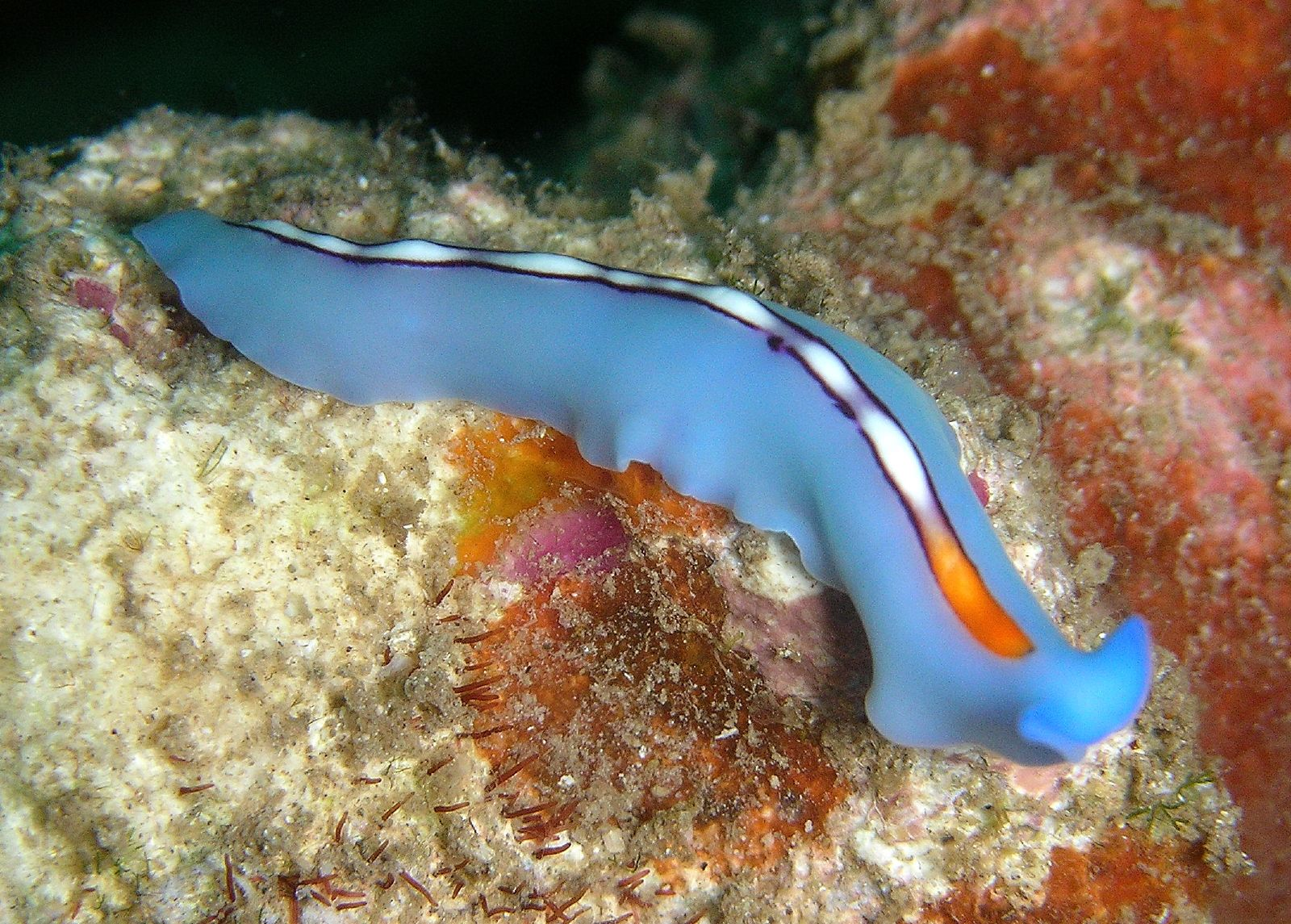

Scientific classification
- Kingdom: Animalia
- Phylum: Platyhelminthes
- Order: Polycladida
- Suborder: Cotylea
- Family: Pseudocerotidae
- Genus: Pseudoceros
- Species: P. bifurcus

Binomial name
- Pseudoceros bifurcus (Prudhoe, 1989)

= Pseudoceros liparus =

Species of flatworm

Pseudoceros bifurcus is a marine flatworm species that belongs to the family Pseudocerotidae.

== Common name ==
Racing stripe flatworm, orange-band flatworm, orange tipped flatworm.

== Distribution ==
Tropical Indo-Pacific, from eastern coast of Africa to Micronesia and China

== Habitat ==
It inhabits the outer reef zone, occurring on reef crests and slopes.

== Size ==
Up to 2 inches (5.1 cm).

== Physical characteristics ==
"Dorsal surface with a background varying from green-bluish to cream with an intense purple margin without forming a distinctive marginal band. There is an orange elongated spot beginning at the cerebral eyespot fading into a white median stripe that ends close to the posterior margin. Cream pseudotentacles formed by simple folds of the anterior margin with numerous ocella. A single cerebral cluster formed by about 30 eyes. Pharynx with elaborated folds."

== Behavior ==
Benthic, diurnals, because of its aposematic colors, it has no fear to crawl around to feed.

== Bibliographical references ==
- Leslie Newman & Lester Cannon, "Marine Flatworms", CSIRO publishing, 2003,ISBN 0-643-06829-5
- Neville Coleman, "Marine life of Maldives", Atoll editions, 2004,ISBN 187-6410-361
- Andrea & Antonnella Ferrrari,"Macrolife", Nautilus publishing, 2003,ISBN 983-2731-00-3
