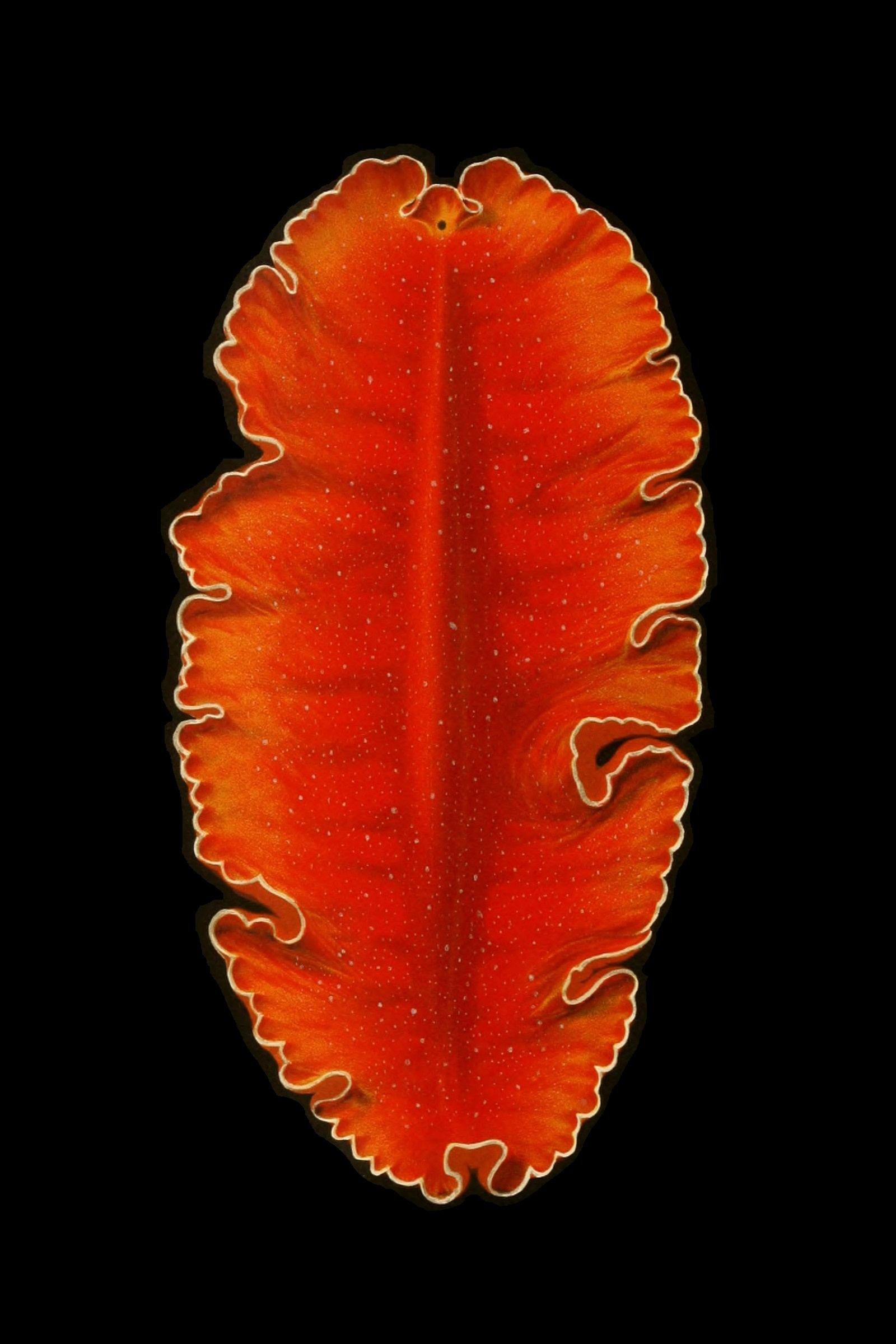

Scientific classification
- Kingdom: Animalia
- Phylum: Platyhelminthes
- Order: Polycladida
- Suborder: Cotylea
- Family: Pseudocerotidae
- Genus: Yungia
- Species: Y. aurantiaca

Binomial name
- Yungia aurantiaca (Delle Chiaje, 1822)

Synonyms
- Planaria aurantiaca Delle Chiaje, 1822; Proceros aurantiacus (Delle Chiaje, 1822); Thysanozoon aurantiacum (Delle Chiaje, 1822); Thysanozoon auriantiacum (Delle Chiaje, 1822); Thysanozoon flavum (Delle-Chiaje, 1822) Örsted, 1844

= Yungia aurantiaca =

Species of flatworm

Yungia aurantiaca is a species of flatworm in the family Pseudocerotidae. It is found in the temperate northeastern Atlantic Ocean and the Mediterranean Sea.

== Description ==
Yungia aurantiaca is a fairly large flatworm, growing to a length of about 40 mm (1.6 in). It is very thin and leaf-like, broadly oval in outline, with a thickened central ridge and a lobed, wavy margin. The dorsal surface is orange with fine white spots and a white margin, and the ventral surface is whitish. Some folds at the edge of the head form folds that function as tentacles. In between these is a horseshoe-shaped ring of eyespots, and the head also bears chemoreceptors. A single central opening on the underside serves both as the mouth and the anus, and opens into the pharynx; this aperture can be used as a sucker to secure the flatworm to the substrate.

== Ecology ==
Yungia aurantiaca is a predator, feeding on tunicates, bryozoans and other small sedentary invertebrates. The flatworm covers its prey with its body and secretes a sticky mucus containing enzymes. The food is taken in by the mouth on the under surface, and the undigested waste is eliminated through the same aperture.

Reproduction is mainly sexual in this species. Individuals are hermaphrodite and fertilisation is by traumatic insemination. When one flatworm has successfully "stabbed" another, sperm is injected and finds its way through the body to the oviducts, where the eggs are fertilised. The flatworm also has great regenerative powers, and if its fragile body is torn into pieces, the sections can grow into viable individuals.

Yungia aurantiaca can creep over surfaces using muscular contractions and the beating of cilia. It can also swim. This is achieved by first bending the head and sides of the body downwards, and this is followed by an undulation of the body, with waves of dorsal and ventral flexion starting at the head and moving backwards along the body.
