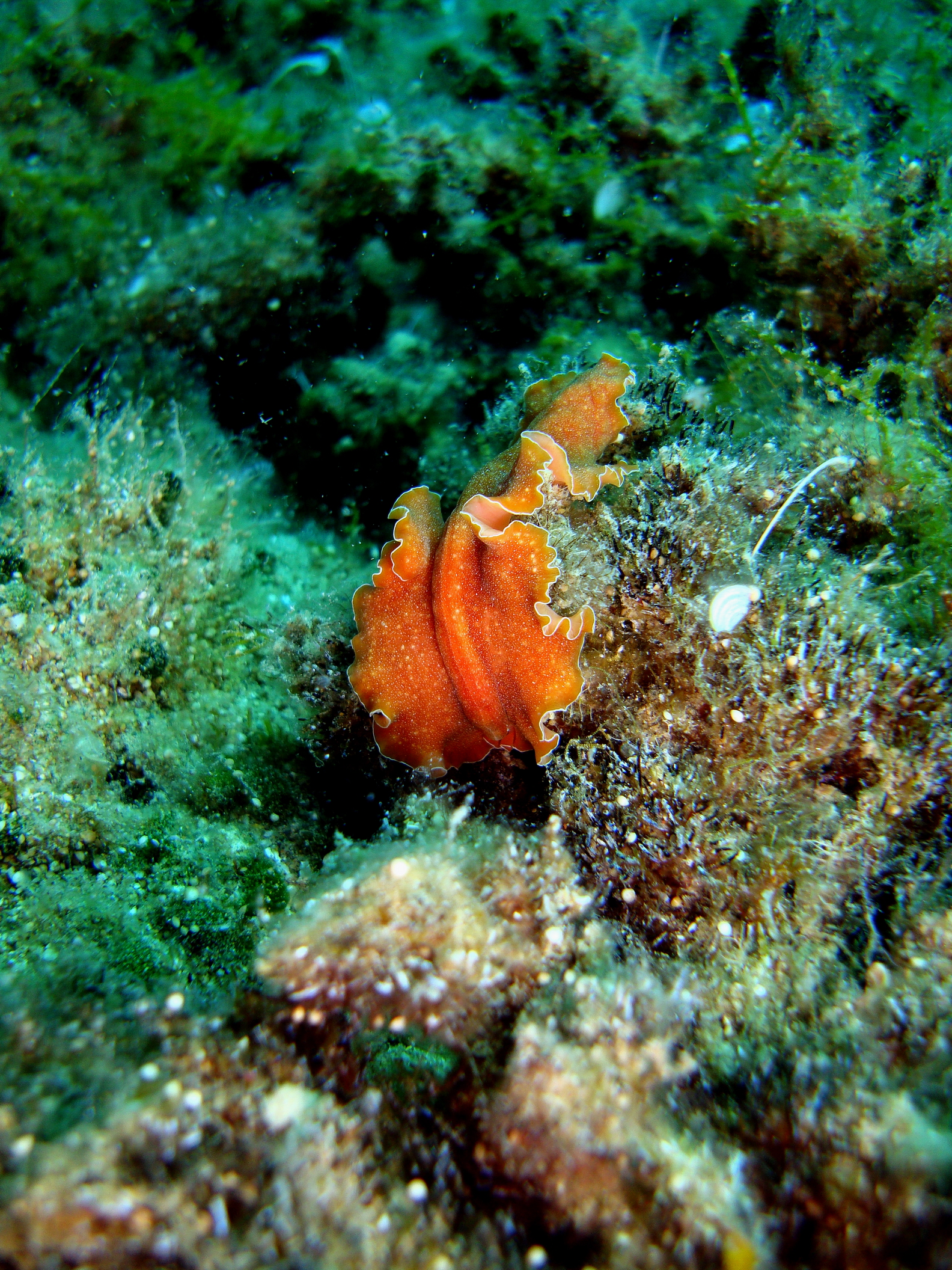
- Yungia aurantiaca

Scientific classification
- Kingdom: Animalia
- Phylum: Platyhelminthes
- Order: Polycladida
- Suborder: Cotylea
- Family: Pseudocerotidae
- Genus: Yungia; Lang, 1884

= Yungia =

Genus of flatworms

Yungia is a genus of flatworms.

== Species ==
- Yungia aurantiaca (Delle Chiaje, 1822)
- Yungia dicquemari (Risso, 1818)
- Yungia teffi Dawydoff, 1952
