= Mulleria =

Mulleria may mean:

- Müller's larva
- Mulleria, Kasaragod, a town in Kerala in India
