= Maiazoon =

Maiazoon orsaki

Scientific classification
- Kingdom: Animalia
- Phylum: Platyhelminthes
- Order: Polycladida
- Suborder: Cotylea
- Family: Pseudocerotidae
- Genus: Maiazoon; Newman & Cannon, 1996
- Species: M. orsaki

Binomial name
- Maiazoon orsaki Newman & Cannon, 1996

Genus of flatworms

Maiazoon is a genus of marine flatworms in the family Pseudocerotidae. It is monotypic, being represented by the single species Maiazoon orsaki, commonly known as the Orsak flatworm.

== Distribution and habitat ==
It is found in the tropical Indo-Pacific from the Maldives to Micronesia. They inhabit the exposed edges of the reef crest and in boulders covered with coralline algae.

== Description ==
Maiazoon orsaki can grow up to 2 inches (51 mm). It possesses a stretched "egg-shaped" body with a ruffled margin, the posterior part of the body is isentagled. The background color can generally go from translucent cream to light brown with a fine median white line. The white line starts back from the eye spots and ends just before the border of the posterior edge. The circumference of the body is ornated with an orange-brown strip and highlighted on the outside by a fine black line. The ventral face presents a similar color to the dorsal face with the white median line less."

== Behaviour ==
Benthic, nocturnals.

== Bibliographical references ==
- Leslie Newman & Lester Cannon, "Marine Flatworms", CSIRO publishing, 2003,ISBN 0-643-06829-5
- Neville Coleman, "Marine life of Maldives", Atoll editions, 2004,ISBN 187-6410-361
- Andrea & Antonnella Ferrrari,"Macrolife", Nautilus publishing, 2003,ISBN 983-2731-00-3
