= A Laboratory Manual for Comparative Vertebrate Anatomy =

Book by Libbie Hyman

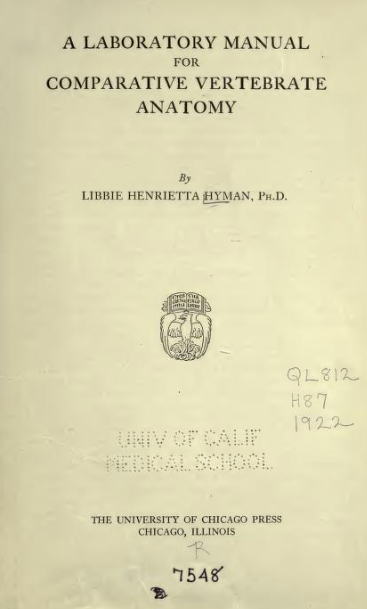
- Title page for A Laboratory Manual for Comparative Vertebrate Anatomy (1922)
- Author: Libbie Hyman
- Original title: A Laboratory Manual for Comparative Vertebrate Anatomy
- Language: English
- Subject: Comparative anatomy
- Published: 1922
- Publisher: University of Chicago Press
- Publication place: United States

A Laboratory Manual for Comparative Vertebrate Anatomy is a textbook written by Libbie Hyman in 1922 and released as the first edition from the University of Chicago Press. It is also called and published simply as Comparative Vertebrate Anatomy. In 1942 Hyman released the second edition as a textbook, as well as a laboratory manual. It was referred to as her 'bread and butter', as she relied on its royalties for income. The Laboratory Manual for Comparative Vertebrate Anatomy still remains the same without revisions, and is used by universities around the world. In the book, she uses Balanoglossus, Amphioxus, sea squirt, lamprey, skate, shark, turtle, alligator, chicken, and cat as specimens.
