= Clathrina arnesenae =

Scientific classification
- Kingdom: Animalia
- Phylum: Porifera
- Class: Calcarea
- Order: Clathrinida
- Family: Clathrinidae
- Genus: Clathrina
- Species: C. arnesenae

Binomial name
- Clathrina arnesenae (Rapp, 2006)

Synonyms
- Guancha arnesenae Rapp, 2006

Species of sponge

Clathrina arnesenae is a species of calcareous sponge from the Atlantic Ocean. It is named after Norwegian spongiologist Emily Arnesen (1867–1928).

Clathrina arnesenae is known from the coastal waters of northern Norway and Greenland from depths between 10 and 90 m (33 and 295 ft).
