= Emily Arnesen =

Norwegian zoologist (1867–1928)

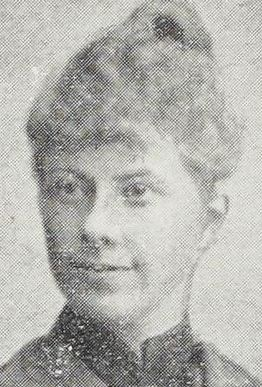
- Emily Arnesen (before 1914)
- Born: 14 June 1867; Kristiania (now Oslo)
- Died: 13 August 1928 (aged 61); Oslo
- Education: University of Kristiania, University of Zurich
- Known for: Studies on sponges
- Scientific career
- Fields: Zoology
- Institutions: Kristiania
- Doctoral advisor: Arnold Lang

Emily Arnesen (14 June 1867 – 13 August 1928) was a Norwegian zoologist. She was the second Norwegian woman to receive a doctoral degree and is most known for her studies on sponges.

== Early life ==
Arnesen began attending the Royal Frederick University of her hometown Kristiania in 1891. She studied science, but was only able to stay for a year, until 1892, before leaving for Stockholm, where she became a governess for a minister's family. Arnesen would periodically return to being a governess for different families throughout the course of her studies in order to make an income. During her time in Stockholm, Arnesen began taking classes which sparked her interest in both zoology and botany. Upon returning to the university of Kristiania, Arnesen began teaching classes and private pupils, including the children of the Prime Minister, Otto Blehr. She spent her free time studying zoology under Johan Hjort. This continued for three years until she left the university and began working in laboratories.

== Adult life ==
Arnesen first attempted to study zoology in a lab in Berlin in 1894, but was rejected. After this, she would teach in Kristiania schools as well as work in the zoological laboratory in town during the school year and studied coastal fauna at the Norwegian coastal biological stations in the summer.

In 1901 Arnesen received a scholarship that allowed her to travel to Zurich in Switzerland. This is where she completed her doctoral studies on the blood vessel system structure in leeches under the supervision of anatomist Arnold Lang. She received her doctorate in 1903.

After receiving her doctorate, Arnesen spent four months at the zoological museum in Amsterdam. Here, under Max Carl Wilhelm Weber, she was responsible for a collection of animals that she had grown interested in during her time working on the coasts of Norway: sponges.

In 1905 Arnesen became a conservator of the Kristiania zoological museum, a position she held until 1926, when she retired due to poor health. She was acting director there during 1913. From 1906 to 1913 she gave lectures on invertebrates at the Royal Frederick University.

=== Involvement in social issues ===
Outside of her biological interests, Arnesen was also present in many social circles and active in political life, especially concerning the rights of women and suffrage. She was a member of the executive committee of the Norwegian Women's Union and frequently wrote for newspapers on topics ranging from professional matters to social issues. She created a communal house for women in 1910 and travelled to the Women’s Peace Congress in the Hague in 1915.

== Published works ==
Arnesen published her first paper in 1898 on the anatomy of corals, but she is most renowned today for her contributions to the study of sponges. She was most likely the first Norwegian to study sponges and few Norwegians have focused on the species since. Arnesen published papers on sponges between 1901 and 1920, with her 1903 paper on the geographical distribution of sponges being especially important.

Arnesen also wrote a text book to be used for high school level zoology. The book was published in 1902 and focused heavily on Charles Darwin's ideas about evolution.

She also published the first guidebook for the zoological museum in 1912. This covered the many different groups of invertebrates and explained collections that were on display.

Arnesen's contribution to sponges is acknowledged in the names of a number of sponges: Haliclona arnesenae, Anchinoe arneseni (now junior synonym of Phorbas perarmatus), and Clathrina arnesenae.
