= Ludwig Karl Schmarda =

Austrian naturalist and traveler

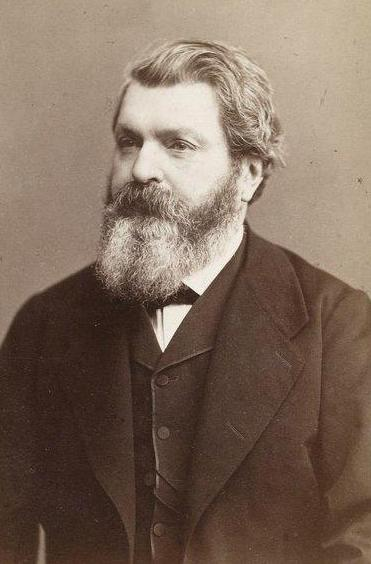
Ludwig Karl Schmarda (1882)

Ludwig Karl Schmarda (23 August 1819 – 7 April 1908) was an Austrian naturalist and traveler, born at Olmütz, Moravia. In 1853 he published a pre-Darwinian work, Die geographische verbreitung der thiere, on the geographical distributions of animals which looked at both marine and terrestrial environments. He was a specialist on marine invertebrates, especially the polychaetes.

== Early life and education ==
Schmarda was born at Olmütz, the son of an artillery officer, and attended the Grammar School and the Philosophical Course at the University of Olomouc. He graduated in 1841. He studied medicine and science at the Josephinum, now part of the Medical University of Vienna, particularly interested in zoology, graduating in 1843 as "Dr Med et Chir.", as well as Magister of Ophthalmology and Gynecology.

== Career ==
In 1843 Schmarda was appointed Chief Field Physician to the dragoon regiment, a mounted infantry ("Dragonerregiment"), and at the same time acted as assistant to "special natural history" at the Josephsakademie. During two scientific journeys to the Adriatic Sea, in 1844 and 1846, he made collections of marine life. In 1848, he became a teacher of natural history and geography at the secondary school in Graz. In 1848/49 he lectured at Joanneum on anthropology as a science and represented the School of Agriculture in 1848 and 1850.

He worked on the infusoria (Protozoa) and produced a monograph Kleine Beiträge der Naturgeschichte der Infusorien in 1846. In 1850 he was appointed professor at the University of Graz, where he founded the Zoological Museum (in the present day Joanneum Natural History Museum), and in 1852 at Prague.

From 1853–1857 he traveled around the world, a trip which was financed by Franz Ritter von Fridau. He published on his travels in 1861 in three volumes of Reise um die Erde in den Jahre 1853-1857. His scientific results were published in two volumes under the title Neue wirbellose thiere beobachtet und gesammelt auf einer reise um die erde 1853 bis 1857. He had a special interest in the inveterbrates, particularly marine worms. He was dismissed from his position in Prague 1855 for exceeding his vacation and he lived on Fridau's estate. His work on zoology with Professor Unger was considered atheistical and not supported by the Ultramontane party in power. He was rehabilitated in 1861 and in 1862 he was appointed professor at the University of Vienna. He served as a court councillor for the Austrian Academy of Sciences and during this period he published a two volume work titled Zoologie (1871,72). In 1883 he retired from service, and visited Spain and the African coast in 1884, 1886, and 1887.

== Legacy ==
Schmarda is credited with being the first scientist to have published the observation that microorganisms respond to light in 1845, which is considered the foundation for the development of ultraviolet germicidal irradiation. Schmarda in his biogeographical divisions made use only of environmental conditions and did not see evolutionary linkages and separations. He saw no separation between the New and Old World faunas. His classification divided the world into 21 land and 10 marine realms. The land divisions included:

- The Polar Region
- Central Europe
- The Caspian Steppe
- Central Asia Proper
- The Mediterranean Region
- China
- Japan
- North America
- The Sahara
- West Africa
- Africa in general
- Madagascar
- India
- The Sunda Region
- Australia
- Central America
- Brazil
- Peru-Chile
- The Pampas
- Patagonia
- Polynesia

== Published works ==
- Andeutungen aus dem Seelenleben der Thiere (1846) – Hints on the mental life of animals.
- Zur Naturgeschichte der Adria (1852) – On the natural history of the Adriatic Sea.
- Die geographische Verbreitung der Thiere (1853) – The geographical distribution of animals
- Zur Naturgeschichte Aegyptens (1854) – Natural history of Egypt.
- Neue wirbellose Thiere (1859–1861) – New invertebrate animals.
- Reise um die Erde (1861) – Journey around the world.
- Zoologie (1871; second edition, 1877–1878), (a textbook for higher institutions).
