= Müller's larva =

Juvenile form of some flatworms

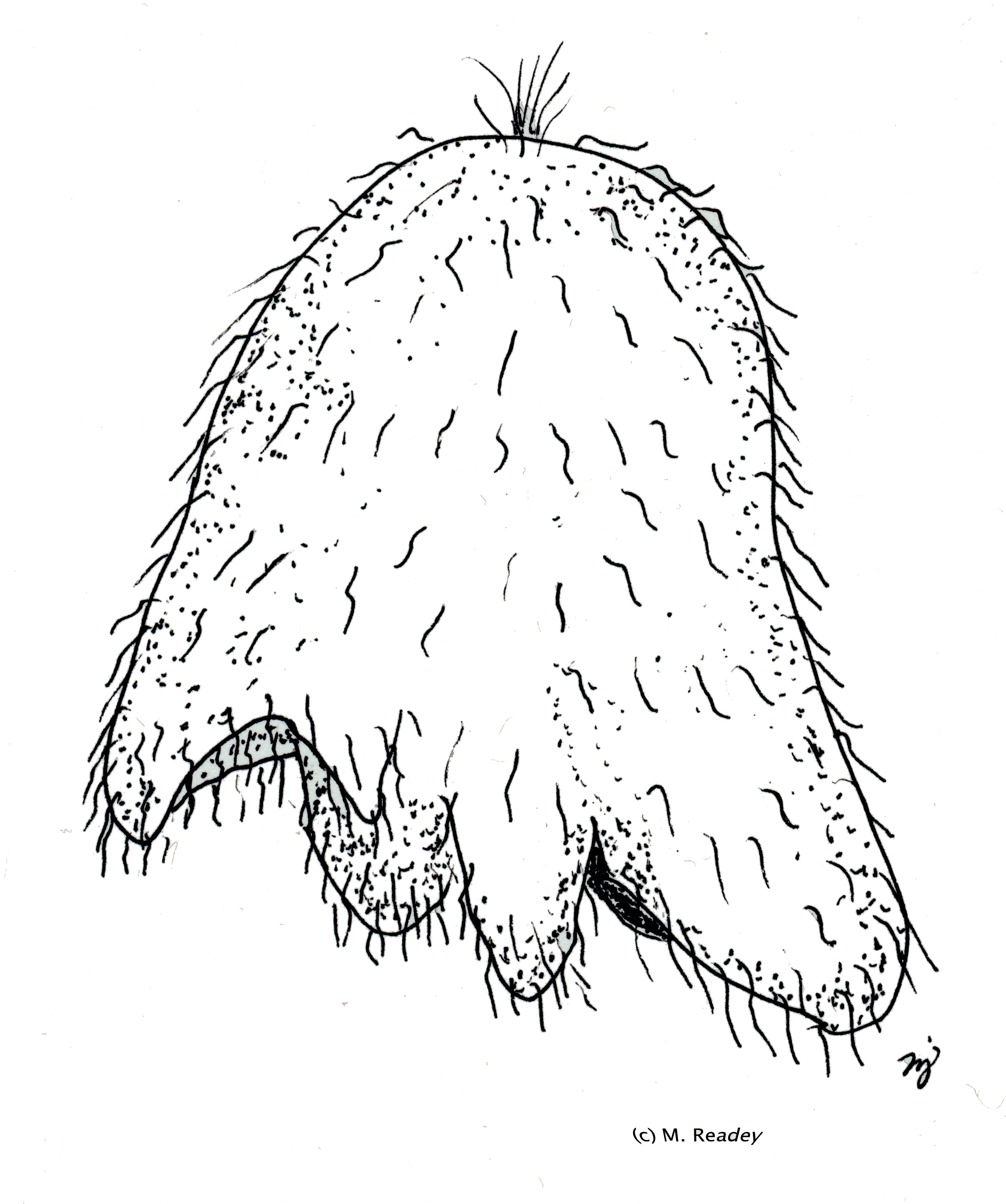
Drawing of a Müller's larva

Müller's larva or Mulleria is a larva of some Polycladida. It has eightfold symmetry and resembles a trochophore; homology between the two types of larvae from related groups of the Spiralia is possible but is not well studied. Müller’s larva is ciliated and has several paired and unpaired lobes. The cilia on the lobes are longer than cilia on the rest of the body. At the anterior and posterior ends of the larva are tufts of longer cilia (apical and caudal). The apical tuft originates from the apical organ, a sensory structure associated with the central nervous system.

It is named after Johannes Peter Müller (1801–1858), a German physiologist who invented the plankton net, and first described larval forms of many phyla.
