= Arnold Lang =

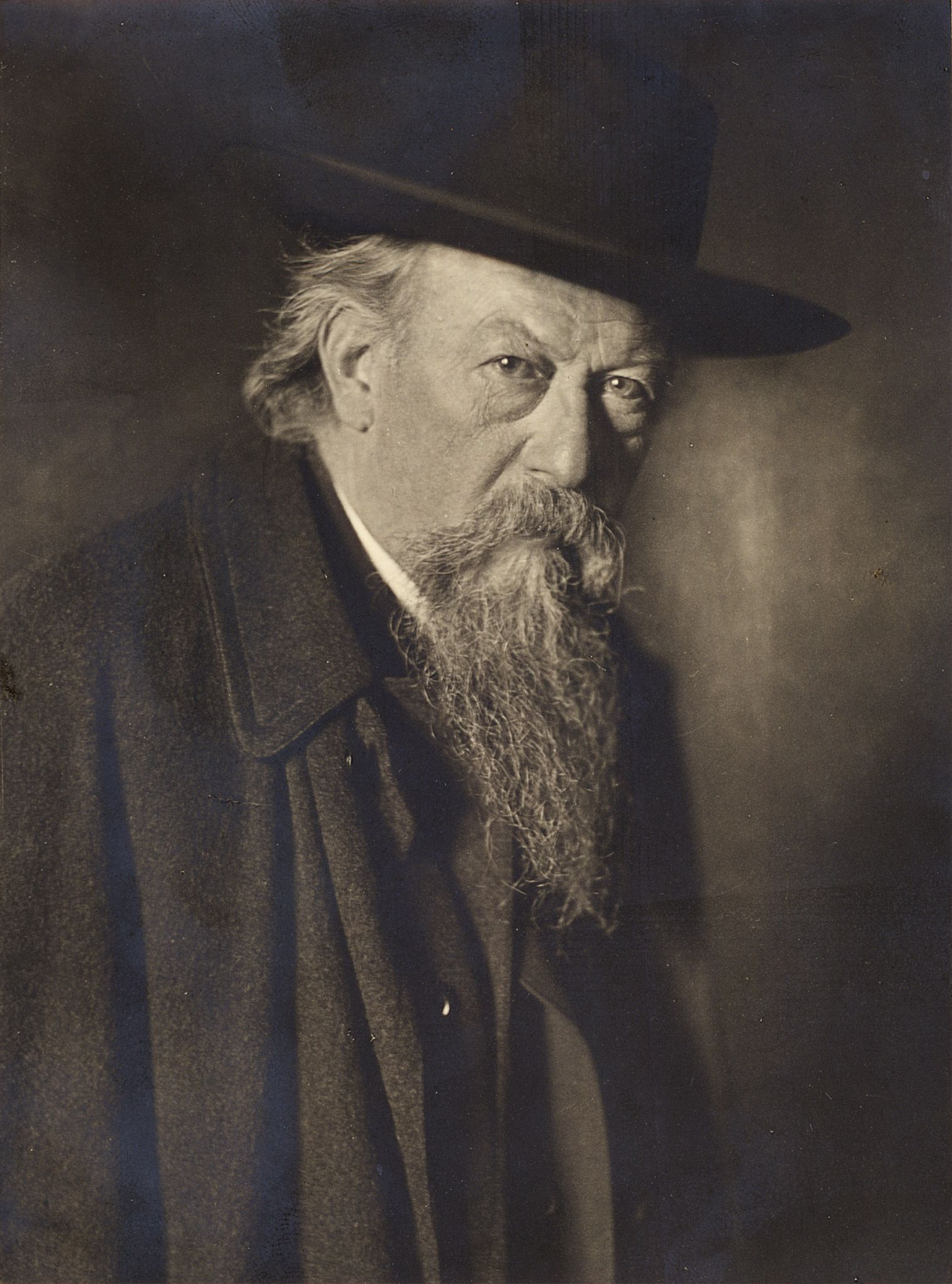
- Born: 18 June 1855; Oftringen
- Died: 30 November 1914 (aged 59); Zurich
- Resting place: Oftringen
- Known for: comparative anatomy and embryology
- Scientific career
- Institutions: University of Zurich

Arnold Lang (18 June 1855 – 30 November 1914) was a Swiss naturalist, a comparative anatomist and student of German biologist Ernst Haeckel.

== Biography ==
In March 1876 he earned his PhD from the University of Jena, and two months later became habilitated as a privat-docent of zoology at the University of Bern. From 1878 to 1885 he was stationed at the Zoological Station in Naples, where he conducted research on wildlife native to the Gulf of Naples. In 1889 he became a professor of zoology and comparative anatomy at the University of Zurich and the Eidgenössische Polytechnikum as well as director of two institutions' zoological collections. From 1898 to 1900 he served as rector at the University of Zurich.

In the autumn of 1891, a European fellowship for the best graduate in class enabled American experimental biologist Lilian Vaughan Morgan to go to Europe and study muscles in chitons at the University of Zurich with Arnold Lang. Norwegian biologist Kristine Bonnevie studied under Arnold Lang in Zürich in the years 1898-99. Lang sponsored the PhD work of Marie Daiber, a German-born Swiss zoologist who became a full professor at University of Zurich. He also taught zoologist Emily Arnesen and philosopher Heinrich Schmidt.

== Works ==
By way of a suggestion from Ernst Haeckel, he published a translation of Jean Baptiste Lamarck's Philosophie zoologique into German (1876). From his research at Naples, he published in 1884 a massive monograph on Polycladida (marine flatworms), and from 1888 to 1894, he issued a textbook on the comparative anatomy of invertebrates that was subsequently translated into French and English.

- Die Polycladen (Seeplanarien) des Golfes von Neapel und der angrenzenden Meeresabschnitte, (1884).
- Lehrbuch der vergleichenden Anatomie der wirbellosen Thiere, 2 Tl., (1888–94).
- Beitrag zu einer Trophocöltheorie, (1903).
- Die experimentelle Vererbungslehre in der Zoologie seit 1900, (1914).
