= Libbie Hyman =

American zoologist

Libbie Henrietta Hyman
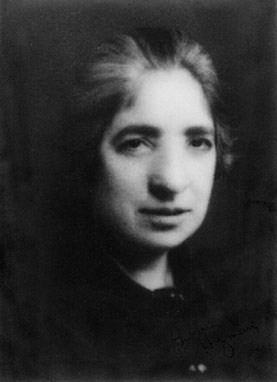
- Born: December 6, 1888; Des Moines, Iowa
- Died: August 3, 1969 (aged 80); New York City, New York, U.S.
- Education: University of Chicago
- Known for: A Laboratory Manual for Elementary Zoology, The Invertebrates
- Awards: Daniel Giraud Elliot Medal (1951); Linnean Medal (1960)
- Scientific career
- Fields: Zoology
- Workplaces: University of Chicago, American Museum of Natural History

Libbie Henrietta Hyman (December 6, 1888 – August 3, 1969), was an American zoologist. She wrote numerous works on invertebrate zoology and the widely used A Laboratory Manual for Comparative Vertebrate Anatomy (1922, revised in 1942).

== Life ==
Born in Des Moines, Iowa, she was a child of Jewish parents, Joseph and Sabina (née Neumann) Hyman. Her father, an emigrant from Poland, adopted the surname "Hyman" when he immigrated to the United States as a youth. Her mother was from Germany. Joseph Hyman successively owned clothing stores in Des Moines, in Sioux Falls, South Dakota, and in Fort Dodge, Iowa, but the family's resources were limited. Hyman attended public schools in Fort Dodge. At home, she was required to do much of the housework. She enjoyed reading, especially books by Charles Dickens in her father's small den, and she took a strong interest in flowers, which she learned to classify with a copy of Asa Gray's Elements of Botany. She also collected butterflies and moths and later wrote, "I believe my interest in nature is primarily aesthetic."

Hyman graduated from high school in Fort Dodge in 1905 as the youngest member of her class and the valedictorian. Uncertain of her future, she began work in a local factory, pasting labels on cereal boxes. The high school teacher who taught English and German persuaded her to attend the University of Chicago, which she entered in 1906 on a one-year scholarship. She continued at the university with further scholarships and nominal jobs. Turning away from botany because of an unpleasant laboratory assistant, she tried chemistry but did not like its quantitative procedures. She then took zoology and was encouraged in it by Professor Charles Manning Child. After receiving a B.S. in zoology in 1910, she acted on Child's advice to continue with graduate work at the University of Chicago. Supporting herself as laboratory assistant in various zoology courses, she concluded that a better laboratory text was needed, which in time she was to supply. She received a Ph.D. in zoology in 1915, with a thesis on regeneration in certain annelid worms. Again unsure of her future, she accepted a position as research assistant in Child's laboratory, and she taught undergraduate courses in comparative anatomy.

After Joseph Hyman's death in 1907, his widow moved to Chicago, bringing her daughter "back into the same unhappy circumstances which lasted until the death of my mother in 1929. I never received any encouragement from my family to continue my academic career; in fact my determination to attend the University met with derision. At home, scolding and fault-finding were my daily portion" (quoted in Hutchinson, p. 106).

== Work ==
At the request of the University of Chicago Press, Hyman wrote A Laboratory Manual for Elementary Zoology (1919), which promptly became widely used, to her astonishment. She followed this, again at the publisher's request, with A Laboratory Manual for Comparative Vertebrate Anatomy (1922), which also had great success. She was, however, much more interested in invertebrates. By 1925 she was considering how to prepare a laboratory guide in that field but "was persuaded by [unnamed] colleagues to write an advanced text" (quoted in Hutchinson, p. 107).

While at the University of Chicago, Hyman also wrote taxonomic papers on such invertebrates as the Turbellaria (flatworms) and North American species of the freshwater cnidarian Hydra. She published an enlarged edition of her first laboratory manual in 1929.

In 1931, Hyman concluded that she could live on the royalties of her published books, and she also recognized that her mentor Child was about to retire. She therefore resigned her position at Chicago. Hyman toured western Europe for fifteen months and then returned to begin writing a treatise on the invertebrates. Settling in New York City in order to use the library of the American Museum of Natural History, she became, in December 1936, an unpaid research associate of the museum, which provided her with an office for the rest of her life. There, Hyman created her six-volume treatise on invertebrates, The Invertebrates, drawing on her familiarity with several European languages and Russian, which she had learned from her father. She compiled notes from books and scientific papers, including those in the many journals to which she subscribed, organized the notes on cards, and wrote an account of each invertebrate group. She took art lessons in order to illustrate her work professionally. She spent several summers studying specimens and drawing illustrations at Bermuda Biological Laboratory, Marine Biological Laboratory, Mt. Desert Island Biological Laboratory, and Puget Sound Biological Station.

Volume I (Protozoa through Ctenophora) of The Invertebrates, was published in February 1940. Volume 2 (Platyhelminthes and Rhynchocoela) and Volume 3 (Acanthocephala, Aschelminthes, and Entoprocta), both published in 1951, were followed by Volume 4 (Echinodermata) in 1955, Volume 5 (Smaller Coelomate Groups) in 1959, and Volume 6 (Mollusca I) in 1967. In it, she developed her scientific theory that the phylum Chordata, including all vertebrates, was evolutionarily related to the apparently very different and very much more primitive Echinodermata, such as starfish. This group is now known as the deuterostomes. Her theory was based upon the morphological data of classical embryology, and has since been confirmed by molecular sequence analysis.

In addition to her major project, Hyman extensively revised A Laboratory Manual for Comparative Vertebrate Anatomy in 1942 into a textbook as well as laboratory manual; she referred to it as her "bread and butter" for its income. She wrote about 136 papers on physiology and systematics of the lower invertebrates and published technical papers on annelid and polyclad worms and on other invertebrates. She commented in a letter: "The polyclads of Bermuda were so pretty that I could not resist collecting them and figuring out Verrill's mistakes" (quoted in Schram, p. 126). Addison Emery Verrill had been an earlier expert in invertebrate classification.

Hyman served as editor of the journal Systematic Zoology from 1959 to 1963. In 1960, she was elected a Fellow of the American Academy of Arts and Sciences. She was honored in 1961 with membership in the National Academy of Sciences, from which she had received the Daniel Giraud Elliot Medal in 1951. She also received the gold medal of the Linnean Society of London (1960) and a gold medal from the American Museum of Natural History (1969). She died from Parkinson's disease in New York City, aged 80.

== Bibliography ==
- Jenner, Ronald A (September 2004). "Libbie Henrietta Hyman (1888-1969): from developmental mechanics to the evolution of animal body plans". J. Exp. Zool. B. 302 (5): 413–23. Bibcode:2004JEZ...302..413J. doi:10.1002/jez.b.21019. ISSN 1552-5007. PMID 15384165.
- Hyman did not keep her correspondence, according to Frederick R. Schram, who found some of her letters to Martin Burkenroad in the archives of the San Diego Natural History Museum; see Schram's "A Correspondence between Martin Burkenroad and Libbie Hyman; or, Whatever Did Happen to Libbie Hyman's Lingerie," in F. M. Truesdale, ed., History of Carcinology, vol. 8 of Crustacean Issues (1993), pp. 119–142.
- A tribute to Hyman is in Edna Yost, American Women of Science (1943), pp. 122–38.
- Memorials are by
  - Richard E. Blackwelder in Journal of Biological Psychology 12 (1970): 1-15
  - Horace W. Stunkard (unsigned) in Nature 225 (1970): 393-94 and in Biology of the Turbellaria (1974, "Libbie H. Hyman Memorial Volume"), pp. ix-xiii, with a bibliography
  - G. Evelyn Hutchinson in National Academy of Sciences, Biographical Memoirs 60 (1991): 103–14, which includes an autobiographical account by Hyman and a selected bibliography.
- An obituary appeared in the New York Times of August 5, 1969.
- Winston, Judith E. (1970–1980). "Hyman, Libbie Henrietta". Dictionary of Scientific Biography. Vol. 21. New York: Charles Scribner's Sons. pp. 434–435. ISBN 978-0-684-10114-9.
- Davidson Reynolds, Moira (2004). American women scientists : 23 inspiring biographies, 1900-2000. Jefferson, NC: McFarland. ISBN 9780786421619. OCLC 60686608.
