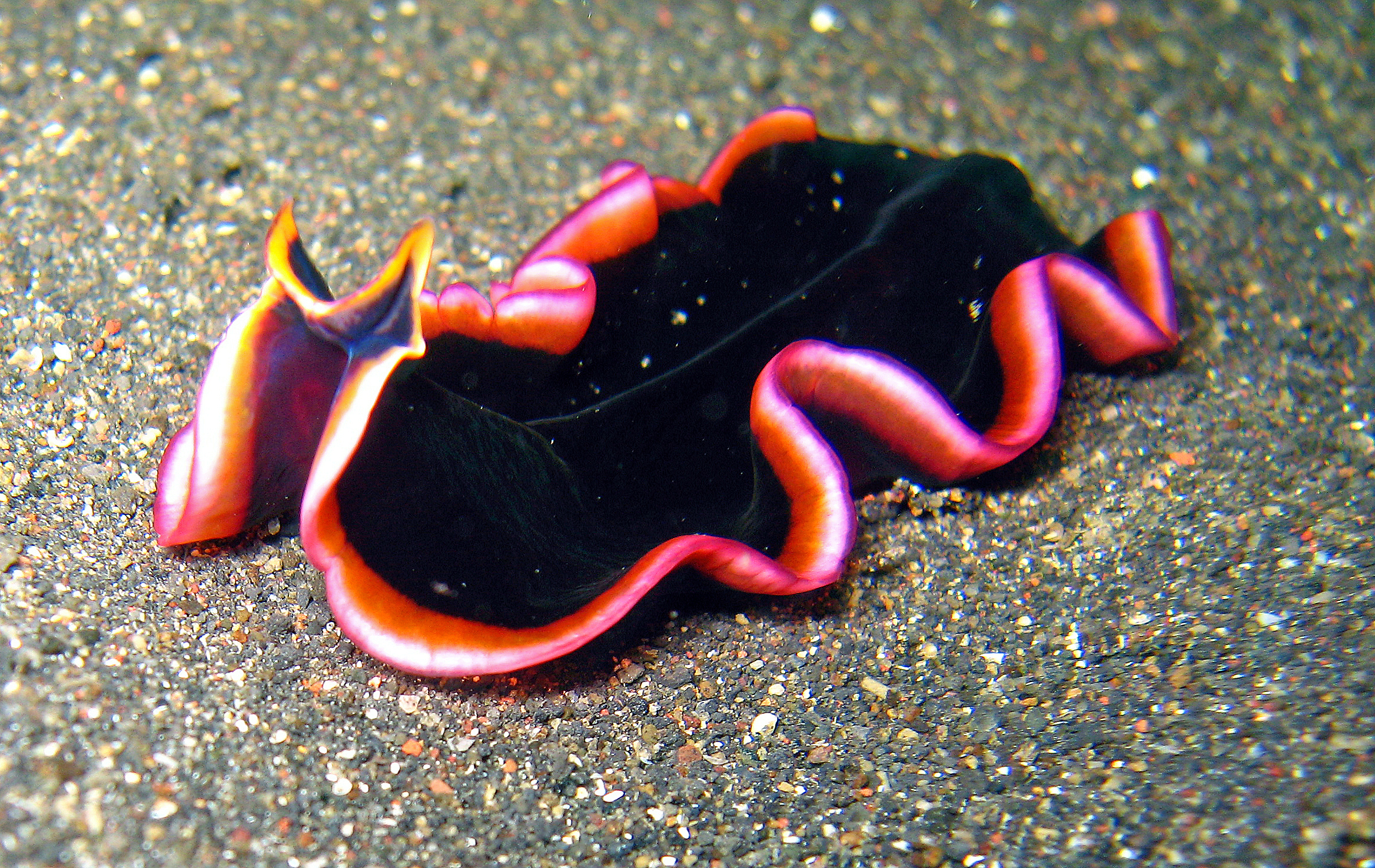
- This image shows a marine flatworm, Pseudobiceros hancockanus with prominent false horns.

Scientific classification
- Kingdom: Animalia
- Phylum: Platyhelminthes
- Order: Polycladida
- Suborder: Cotylea
- Family: Pseudocerotidae; Lang, 1884

Genera
- Acanthozoon Collingwood, 1876; Bulaceros Newman & Cannon, 1996; Maiazoon Newman & Cannon, 1996; Monobiceros Faubel, 1984; Nymphozoon Hyman, 1959; Phrikoceros Newman & Cannon, 1996; Pseudobiceros Faubel, 1984; Pseudoceros Lang, 1884; Thysanozoon Grube, 1840; Yungia Lang, 1884

= Pseudocerotidae =

Family of flatworms

Pseudocerotidae is a family of flatworms which includes the Bedford's flatworm. Pseudocerotidae are simple organisms categorized by their oval bodies and tentacles and bright colors. They use the cilia to glide along surfaces. Most commonly referred to as marine flatworms, closely related to the orders Macrostomorpha and Lecithoepitheliata. These organisms have very complex reproductive systems, no blood systems or organs for gas exchange, a simple brain and are hermaphroditic.

== Habitat ==
Coral reefs are common habitats for many species of pseudocerotidae.

Due to the anthropogenic transportation of non-native marine species, their species can be found all around the world in tropical and subtropical waters near coral reefs, shallow reefs, deep waters, water surfaces and in aquaculture areas. The most biodiverse areas with these species are the Caribbean and Indo-Pacific regions.

== Diet ==
Because of their soft bodies and slow movements, pseudocerotidae must prey on organisms with little to no movement. This is why their diet is composed of scavenging for various sponges, other stationary or dead invertebrates. They use their sensory detectors to chemically sense their food. The food is digested before entering the body. Then the food travels through their pharynx, "...which can then grow to be the size of the whole flatworm".

== Phenology ==
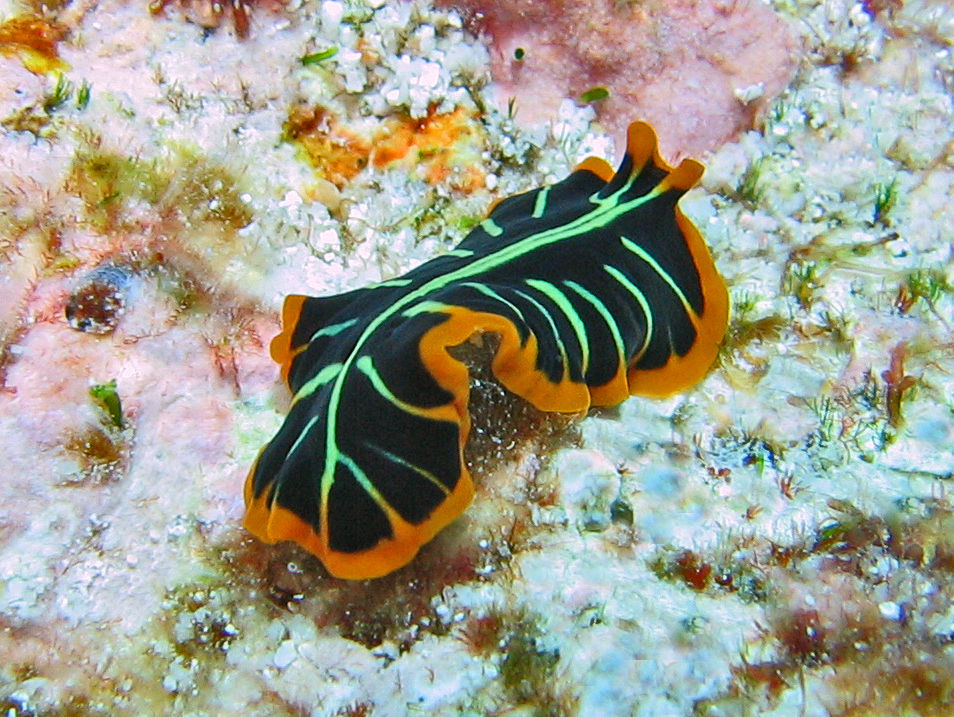
Pseudoceros dimidiatus- Marine flatworm using cilia to crawl along a surface.

Polycladia are typically distinguished by their hermaphroditic reproductive system and their external anatomy such as their eyespot arrangement, pharynx and tentacles. In an experiment Pseudoceros and Pseudobiceros were previously based on their reproductive systems, the two groups of Pseudocerotidae were divided into groups through their genetic difference. A difference in an expansive segment of 28S rDNA, showed small genetic difference in the species Pseudoceros bifurcus.

== Reproduction ==
Penis fencing is not purely for reproduction and is not an aggressive battle of insemination, it is a mating ritual that can result in insemination of both individuals willfully. A few species show long-term care for their young, this care is typically shown in species that have smaller offspring sizes, while larger offspring sizes with faster development in species cause little care for the young after birth. The egg capsules produced are most commonly smooth and round, except for a few species where they have pointed opercula. Egg capsules can reach thousands; in a study the number of eggs for each of two different flatworms was 1,307 and 3,073.
