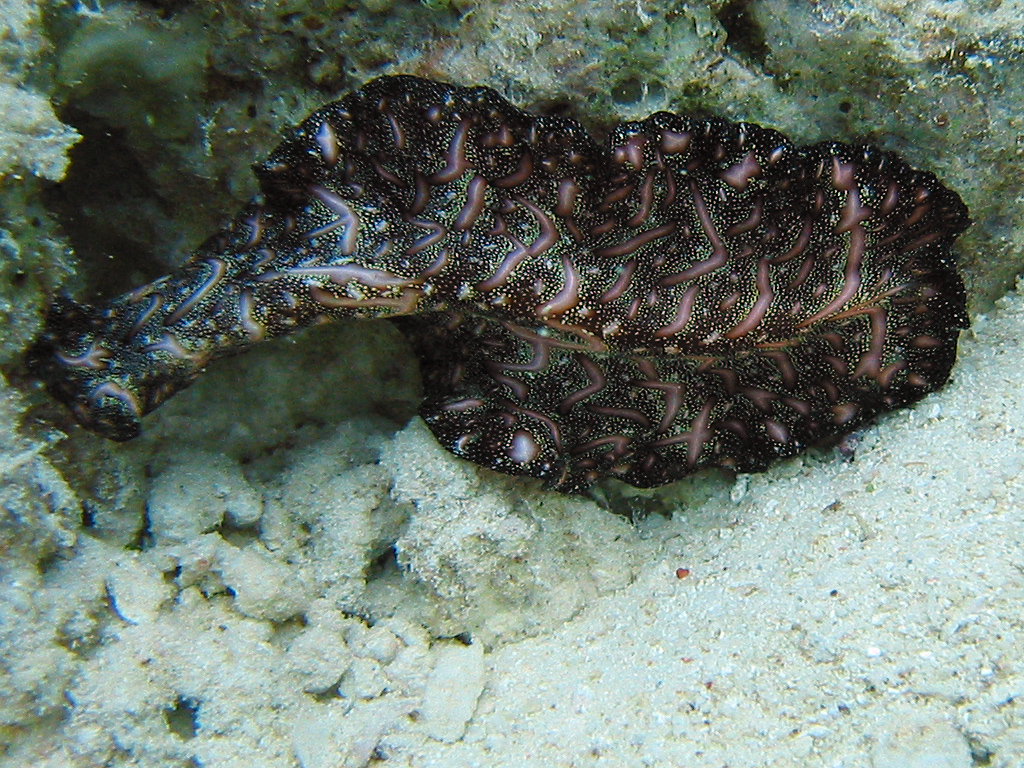
- Pseudobiceros bedfordi (Persian carpet flatworm)

Scientific classification
- Kingdom: Animalia
- Phylum: Platyhelminthes
- Subphylum: Rhabditophora
- Order: Polycladida; Lang, 1884

Suborder
- Cotylea; Acotylea; †Platydendron (not placed in a phylum)

= Polycladida =

Polycladida Temporal range: 508–0 Ma

Order of free-living marine flatworms

Polycladida is a highly diverse order of free-living marine flatworms. They are known from the littoral to the sublittoral zone (extending to the deep hot vents), and many species are common from coral reefs. Only a few species are found in freshwater habitats.

== Description ==
Polyclads range from 3 millimetres (0.12 in) to 10 centimetres (3.9 in) in length with a flattened, roughly oval, body shape and, in many cases, a pair of short tentacles on the head. They are distinguished from other related animals by the presence of a folded pharynx, an elongated intestine with numerous complex diverticula, and multiple ocelli.

The etymology of the order name Polycladida corresponds to the two ancient Greek words πολύς (polús), meaning "numerous", and κλάδος (kládos), meaning "branch". It refers to the ramified shape of the intestine in these flatworms.

Most polyclads hide away from direct light. However, some of the brightly colored species often are active during the day. With their flamboyant coloring they advertise their potential toxicity to visual predators such as fish.

== Development ==
Some polyclads develop through a Müller's larval stage.

== Ecology ==
Often polyclads are associated with other invertebrates, such as bivalve mollusks, sponges, corals, or ascidians. In such associations, the worms may use the invertebrates as a source of food, or they may find protection from predators inside the structural framework of these hosts.

== Systematics ==
The order Polycladida is divided into the two suborders, Cotylea and Acotylea, based on the character "presence/absence of a cotyl or sucker". Of the two, the Acotylea is the larger group with over 26 families worldwide. Acotyleans are major predators of sessile marine invertebrates such as all commercial bivalves species (including pearl and rock oysters), mussels, scallops and giant clams. Acotyleans are dull in coloration, and cryptic in their behavior, hiding in crevices and under coral during the day.

Cotyleans, on the other hand, with as many as 16 families, are prominent members of tropical coral reef communities and have bright, colorful bodies. Although cotylean flatworms are conspicuous predators in subtropical and tropical ecosystems, they are difficult to study. These worms are very fragile and when disturbed can break apart.

Some examples of Polycladida families are as follows:

- Discocelidae
- Cestoplanidae
- Planoceridae
- Stylochidae
- Ditremageniidae
- Prosthiostomidae
- Opisthogeniidae
- Pseudocerotidae

== Phylogeny ==
In 2017, molecular analyses produced well-supported phylogenetic hypotheses that confirmed the monophyly of Polycladida, as well as that of Acotylea and of Cotylea.

== Images ==
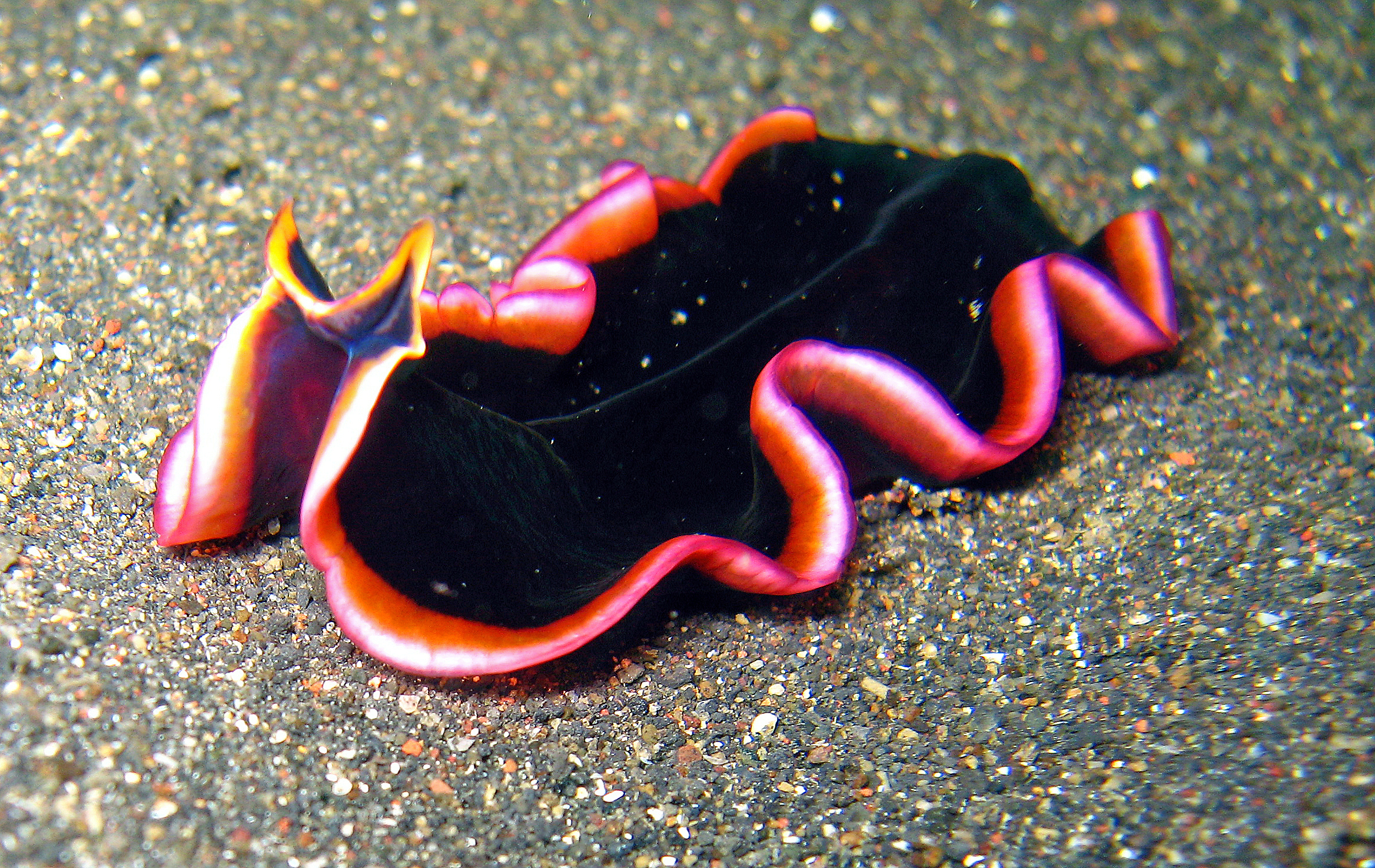
Marine flatworm,
Pseudobiceros sp.

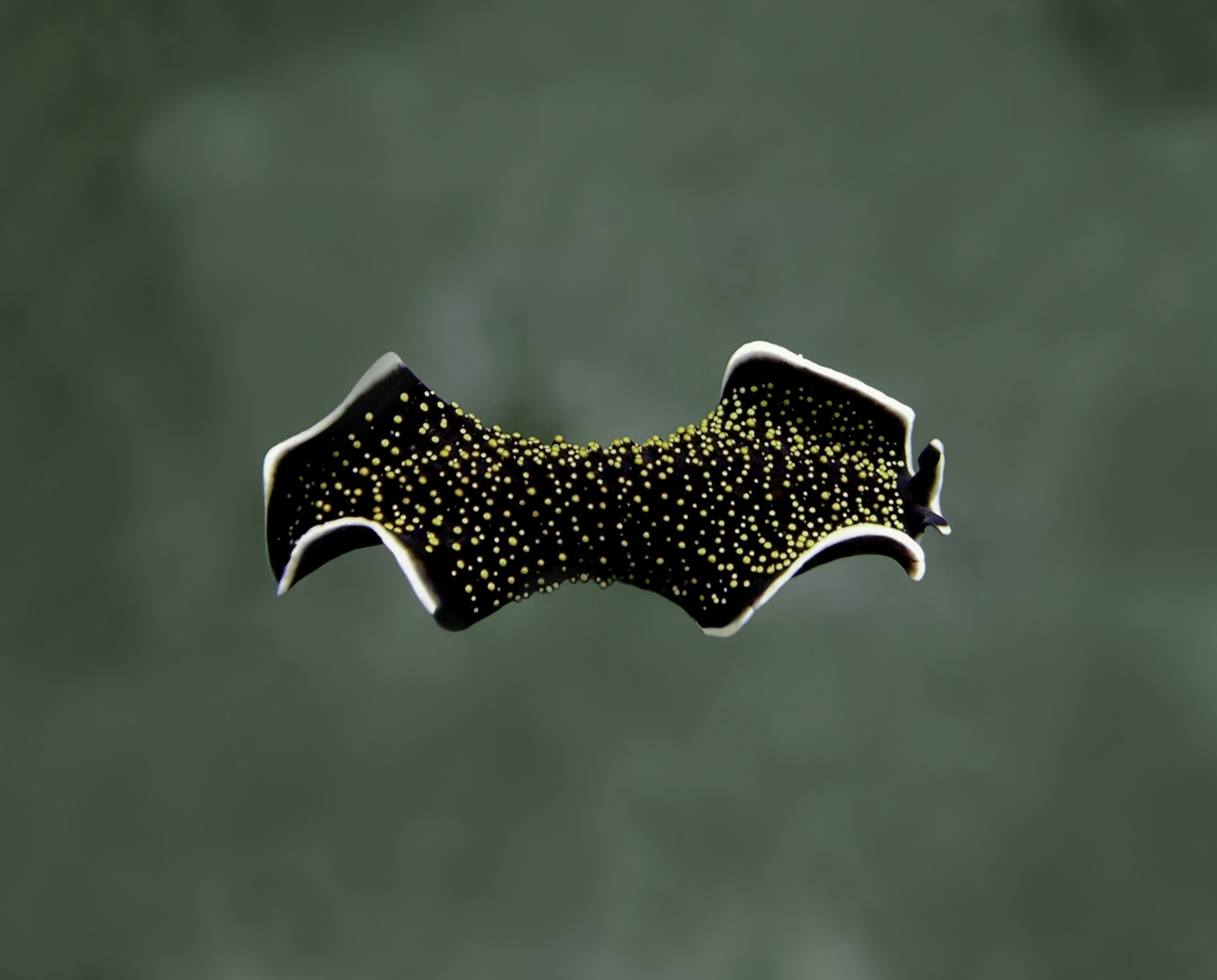
Yellow papillae flatworm,
Thysanozoon nigropapillosum
