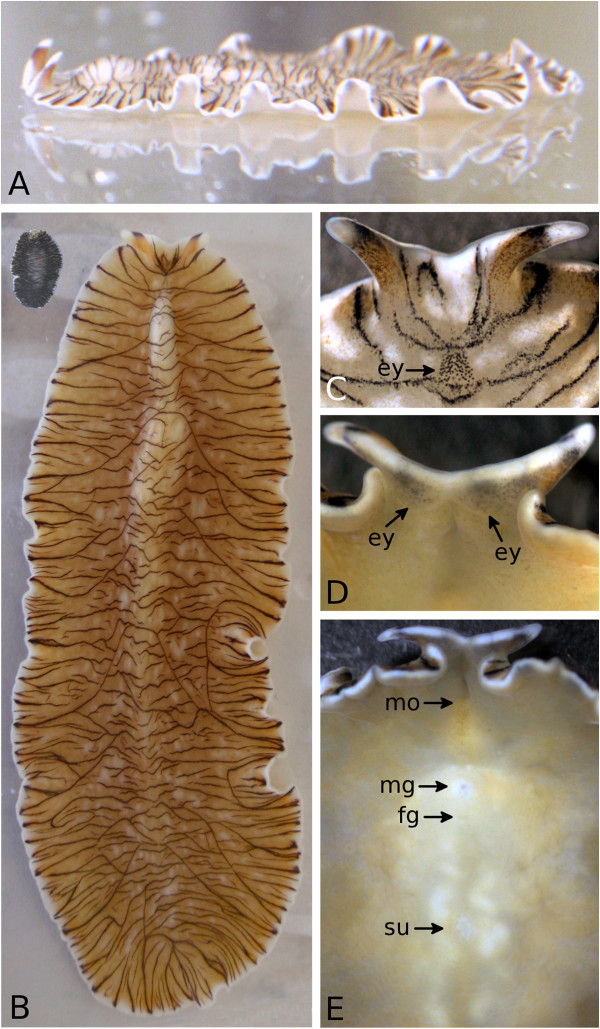
- Maritigrella crozieri

Scientific classification
- Kingdom: Animalia
- Phylum: Platyhelminthes
- Order: Polycladida
- Suborder: Cotylea
- Family: Euryleptidae
- Genus: Maritigrella
- Species: M. crozierae

Binomial name
- Maritigrella crozierae (Hyman, 1939)

Synonyms
- Pseudoceros crozieri Hyman, 1939

= Maritigrella crozierae =

Species of flatworm

Maritigrella crozierae, the tiger flatworm, is a species of marine polyclad flatworm in the family Euryleptidae. It is found on the eastern coasts of North America and the Caribbean Sea where it feeds on colonial sea squirts.

== Description ==
Maritigrella crozierae is a large flatworm. The upper side of its body is boldly striped in yellow and black. The underside is creamy white with a sucker near the centre. The margin is ruffled, rimmed with orange and fringed with small orange tentacles. It has a tubular pharynx and two tentacles at the front of its head, formed from folds of parts of the front of its body. Just behind these is its brain, with two elongated clusters of ocelli (eyespots) on either side. It usually grows to about 20 mm (0.8 in) in length and occasional individuals may reach twice this size.

== Distribution ==
Maritigrella crozierae is found in shallow water in the western Atlantic Ocean and the Caribbean Sea. Its range extends from South Carolina to Florida and includes the Gulf of Mexico and Bermuda.

== Biology ==
Maritigrella crozierae is common in the Indian River Lagoon where it feeds exclusively on the mangrove tunicate, Ecteinascidia turbinata. In other parts of its range it feeds on other sea squirts but seems to become habituated to the species it first ate. It everts its pharynx into a zooid and sucks out the interior tissues. A colony of mangrove tunicates is often home to two flatworms, each eating about 19 zooids a day. The tunicate produces a secondary metabolite called trabectedin which has been shown to have anti-tumour properties. As it feeds, the flatworm gradually builds up the concentration of this chemical in its body. For this reason, it may be of interest to the pharmaceutical industry as a source of this compound which has been approved for medical use in the European Union.

Maritigrella crozierae is a simultaneous hermaphrodite, which means that an individual has both male and female gonads at the same time. Fertilisation is internal by hypodermic copulation. One individual approaches another from behind, rears up and falls forward, piercing the other with a fine stylet and inserting white bundles of sperm. Often the second individual reciprocates and both are inseminated at the same time. About 48 hours later, several clumps of cream coloured eggs are laid. These later hatch into larvae known as Muller's larvae which are planktonic.

Maritigrella crozieri are also able to reproduce asexually through fission. When it divides into two or more parts, either on its own terms or due to predator influence, it can restore the lost part. If a considerable amount of each part remains undamaged, more than one tiger flatworm can grow back.
