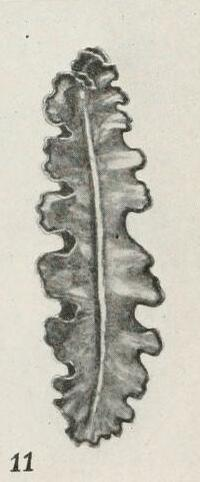
- Illustration of Simpliciplana marginata

Scientific classification
- Kingdom: Animalia
- Phylum: Platyhelminthes
- Order: Polycladida
- Suborder: Cotylea
- Family: Anonymidae
- Genus: Simpliciplana; Kaburaki, 1923
- Species: S. marginata

Binomial name
- Simpliciplana marginata Kaburaki, 1923

= Simpliciplana =

Genus of flatworms

Simpliciplana is a genus of flatworms in the family Anonymidae. It is represented by the single species Simpliciplana marginata. The holotype of the species was collected from Tominado Island, Tawi Tawi, Philippines.

== Description ==
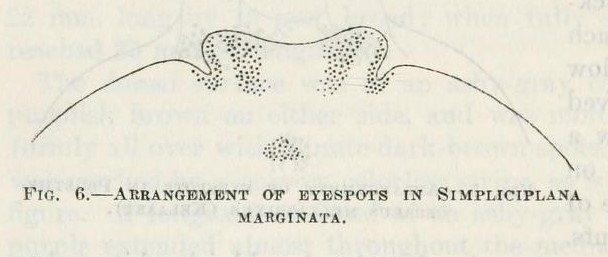
Arrangement of eyespots in Simpliciplana marginata

Numerous small eyespots form two irregular groups arranged in the tentacular flap, while slightly larger eyespots form an almost circular cluster over the location of the brain.

It is one of the few cotylean genera lacking ventral suckers, along with some members of Cestoplanidae, members of Theamatidae, Amakusaplana, and, possibly, Chromyella.

== Taxonomy ==
Although described in its original description in 1923 as a member of the family Diplopharyngeatidea, in 1984, Fabel included it in the familty Anonymidae, emending the family to include other genera that, like the already included Anonymus, lacked prostatic glands, vesicles, or prostatoid organs.
