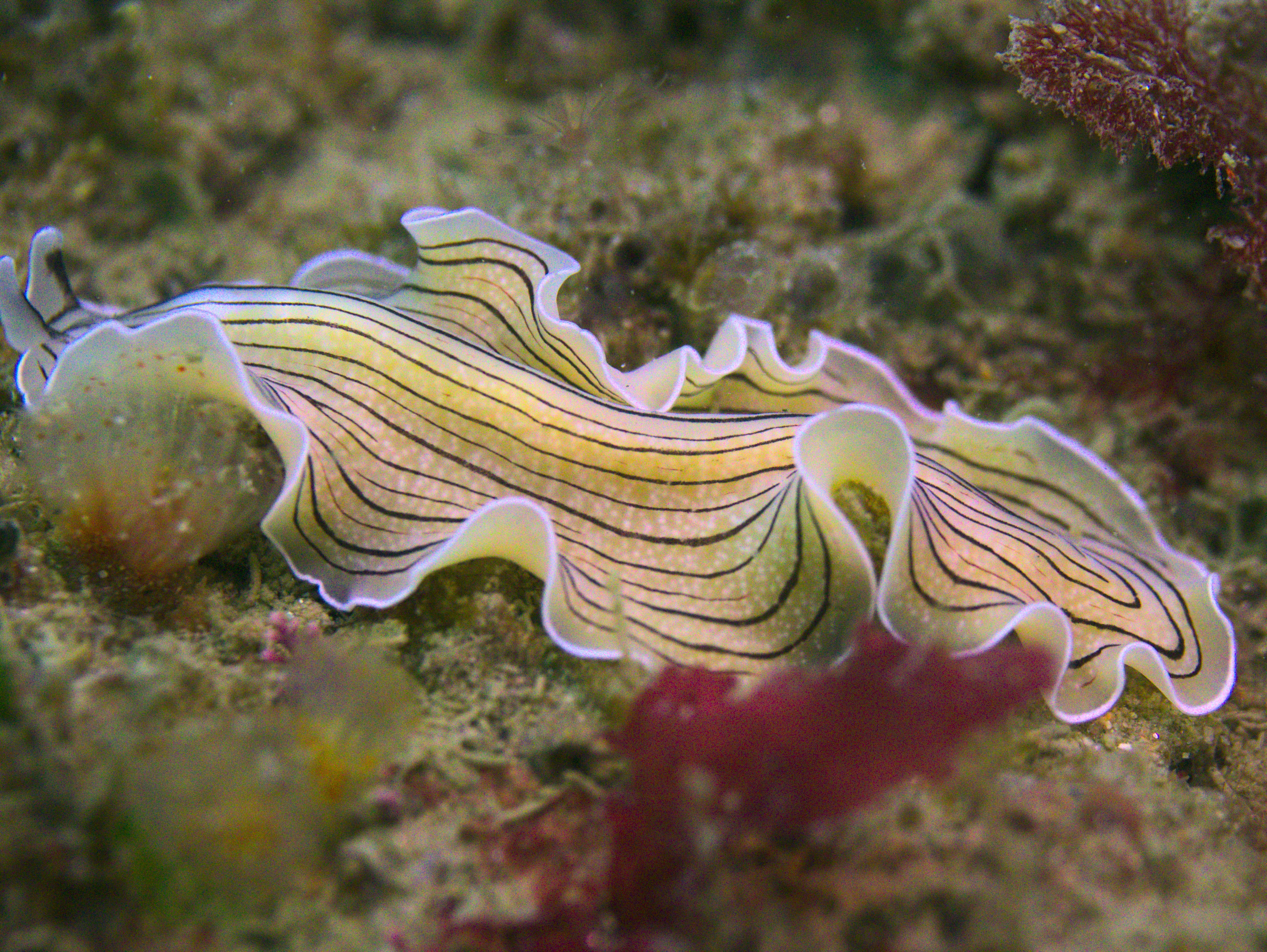

Scientific classification
- Kingdom: Animalia
- Phylum: Platyhelminthes
- Order: Polycladida
- Suborder: Cotylea
- Family: Euryleptidae
- Genus: Prostheceraeus
- Species: P. vittatus

Binomial name
- Prostheceraeus vittatus (Montagu, 1815)

Synonyms
- Eurylepta cristata (Quatrefage, 1845); Eurylepta vittata (Montagu, 1815); Nautiloplana cristata (Quatrefage, 1845); Planaria vittata Montagu, 1815; Proceros cristatus Quatrefage, 1845; Prostheceraeus cristatus (Quatrefage, 1845)

= Prostheceraeus vittatus =

Species of flatworm

Prostheceraeus vittatus, the candy striped flatworm, is a species of marine polyclad flatworm in the family Euryleptidae. It is found in Western Europe, including on the western coasts of the British Isles.

== Description ==
Prostheceraeus vittatus can grow to a length of about 50 mm (2 in) and a width of 25 mm (1 in). It is elliptical in shape with a rounded anterior (front) end and a more tapering posterior (back) end. It is dorso-ventrally flattened with an undulating wavy margin, which is formed into a pair of tentacles at the anterior end. The tentacles bear many simple eyes, and further eyes are to be found just behind the cerebral organ. The mouth is on the underside and the gut divides into many anastomosing branches that take nutrients to all parts of the body. There is a ventral sucker. This flatworm is a distinctive yellowish or cream colour with a central black longitudinal stripe and other fainter dark stripes parallel with the margin. It lacks segmentation and does not have any dorsal processes as do sea slugs, with which this flatworm might be confused; the two are not closely related and this animal is a flatworm and not a mollusc.

== Distribution ==
Prostheceraeus vittatus occurs in the temperate northeastern Atlantic Ocean. Its range includes the western coasts of the British Isles, the North Sea, the English Channel and the western Mediterranean Sea. Apart from the United Kingdom and Ireland, it has been recorded from Denmark, Norway and Corsica. It is found from the intertidal zone down to depths of 20 m (66 ft) or more. In the intertidal zone it hides in crevices, under stones, under seaweed and among colonies of tunicates.

== Ecology ==
Turbellarians appear to glide over the substrate, being moved by the wafting of cilia on the ventral surface. They are carnivorous, feeding on tunicates and other small invertebrates. They are hermaphrodites, reproducing by copulation with internal fertilisation. Small batches of eggs are laid in gelatinous masses and develop directly into miniature adults.
