= Diposthidae =

Scientific classification
- Kingdom: Animalia
- Phylum: Platyhelminthes
- Order: Polycladida
- Suborder: Cotylea
- Family: Diposthidae

Family of flatworms

Diposthidae is a family of flatworms belonging to the order Polycladida.

Genera:

- Asthenoceros Laidlaw, 1903
- Diposthus Woodworth, 1898
