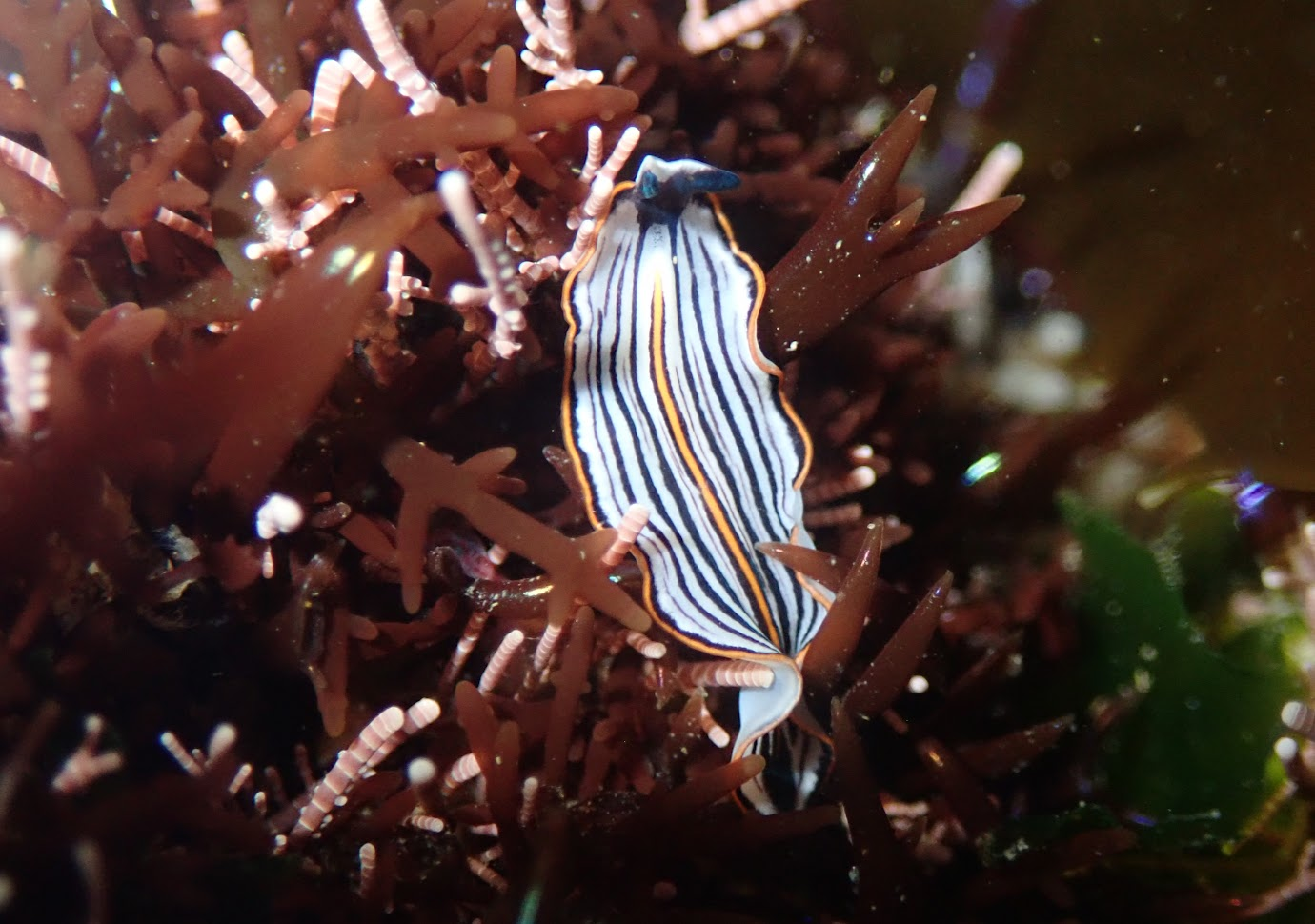

Scientific classification
- Kingdom: Animalia
- Phylum: Platyhelminthes
- Order: Polycladida
- Suborder: Cotylea
- Family: Euryleptidae
- Genus: Praestheceraeus; Faubel, 1984
- Species: P. bellostriatus

Binomial name
- Praestheceraeus bellostriatus (Hyman, 1953)

= Praestheceraeus bellostriatus =

Species of flatworm

Praestheceraeus bellostriatus, commonly known as the black-striped flatworm or the striped flatworm, is a species of free-living marine polyclad worm in the family Euryleptidae.

== Distribution ==
Praestheceraeus bellostriatus is found in the eastern Pacific Ocean, from Monterey Bay to Baja California Sur. It inhabits the low intertidal zone down to the shallow subtidal depths in habitats such as rocky tide pools and manmade wharf pilings.

== Description ==
Praestheceraeus bellostriatus ranges in base color from dark blue to black, with extensive white or pale blue stripes running lengthwise along the top of its flat body. Like other flatworms in the order Polycladida, aside from the two stout tentacles on its head, this species has a remarkably flat, fragile, ovaloid body. As a cotylean flatworm, Praestheceraeus bellostriatus is brightly colored, though unlike its tropical relatives it inhabits relatively cold water. It has a mid-dorsal stripe, which is orange; the margin, or the edges of its body, is of the same bright hue. It grows up to 1.5 in (35 mm) in length and up to 1 in (25 mm) in width.
