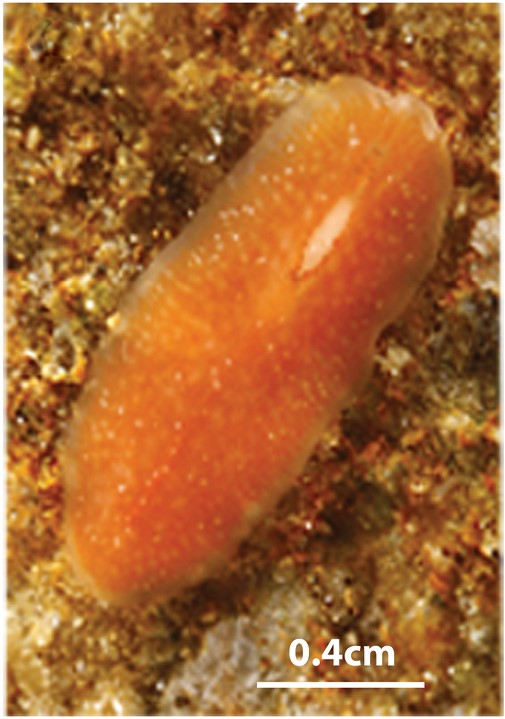
- Stylostomum ellipse from Ría de Arousa, Spain

Scientific classification
- Kingdom: Animalia
- Phylum: Platyhelminthes
- Order: Polycladida
- Suborder: Cotylea
- Family: Stylostomidae
- Genus: Stylostomum; Lang, 1884

Type species
- Planaria ellipsis Dalyell, 1853

Species
- See Taxonomy

= Stylostomum =

Genus of flatworms

Stylostomum is a genus of flatworms in the family Stylostomidae. All species in the genus are found in the boreal and temperate realms north of latitude 36°N and south of latitude 36°S, with the exception of S. mixtomaculatum found in the west coast of India.

== Taxonomy ==
The following species are recognised in the genus Stylostomum:

- S. ellipse (Dalyell, 1853)
- S. felinum Marcus, 1954
- S. frigidum Bock, 1931
- S. fulvum Giard, 1888
- S. lentum Heath & McGregor, 1912
- S. mixtomaculatum Pitale & Apte, 2019
- S. rusticum Giard, 1888
- S. sanjuania Holleman, 1972
- S. spanis Holleman, 2001
