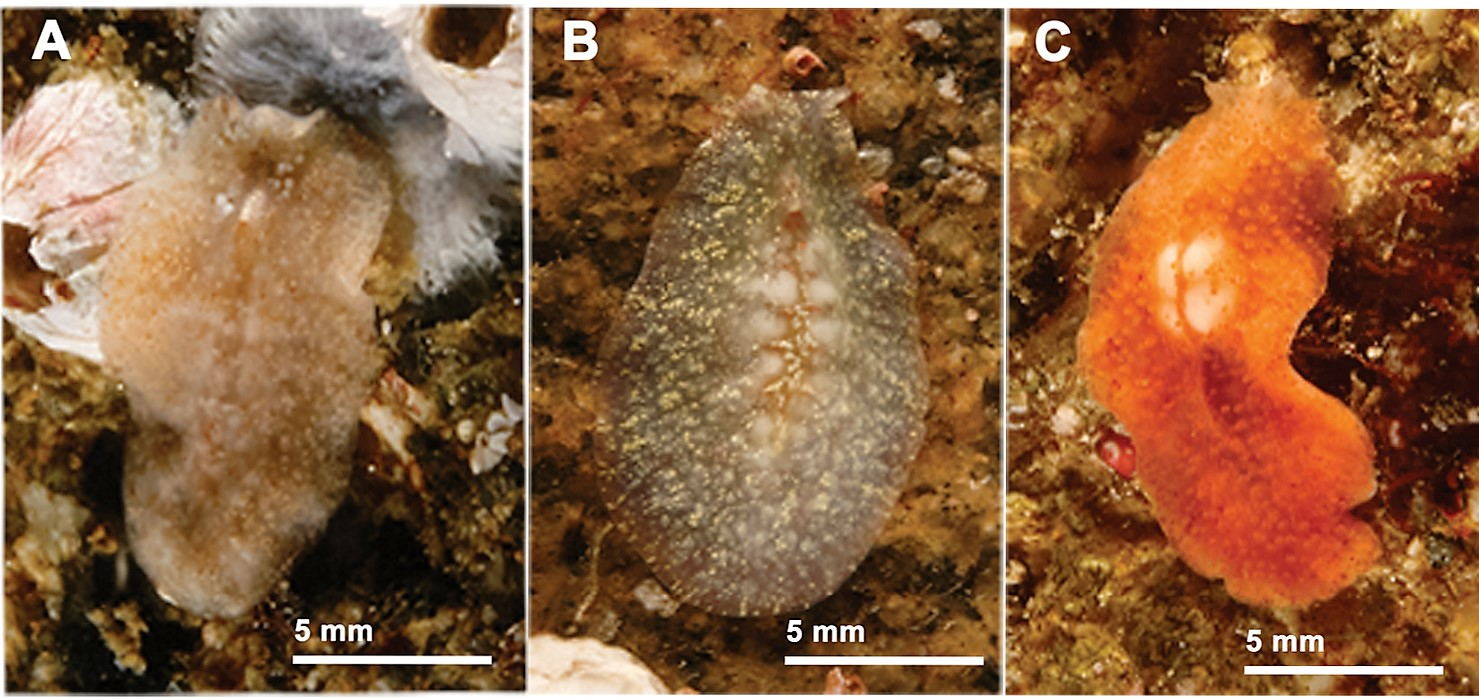
- Cycloporus papillosus living specimens, displaying their colouration diversity

Scientific classification
- Kingdom: Animalia
- Phylum: Platyhelminthes
- Order: Polycladida
- Suborder: Cotylea
- Family: Euryleptidae
- Genus: Cycloporus; Lang, 1884

Type species
- Cycloporus papillosus (Sars, 1878)

Species
- See Taxonomy

= Cycloporus =

Genus of flatworms

Cycloporus is a genus of flatworms in the family Euryleptidae.

== Taxonomy ==
The following species are recognised in the genus Cycloporus:

- C. albofasciatus Newman & Cannon, 2002
- C. atratus Newman & Cannon, 2002
- C. australis Prudhoe, 1982
- C. decoratus Pitale & Apte, 2021
- C. gabriellae Marcus, 1950
- C. guttatus Newman & Cannon, 2002
- C. harlequin Newman & Cannon, 2002
- C. japonicus Kato, 1944
- C. maculatus Hallez, 1893
- C. papillosus (Sars, 1878)
- C. pinkipus Egger & Dittmann, 2023
- C. reticulatus Newman & Cannon, 2002
- C. spiritus Newman & Cannon, 2002
- C. variegatus Kato, 1934
- C. venetus Newman & Cannon, 2002
- C. xanthopunctatus Newman & Cannon, 2002
