= Amyellidae =

Scientific classification
- Kingdom: Animalia
- Phylum: Platyhelminthes
- Order: Polycladida
- Suborder: Cotylea
- Family: Amyellidae

Family of flatworms

Amyellidae is a family of flatworms belonging to the order Polycladida.

Genera:

- Amyella Bock, 1922
- Chromyella Correa, 1958
