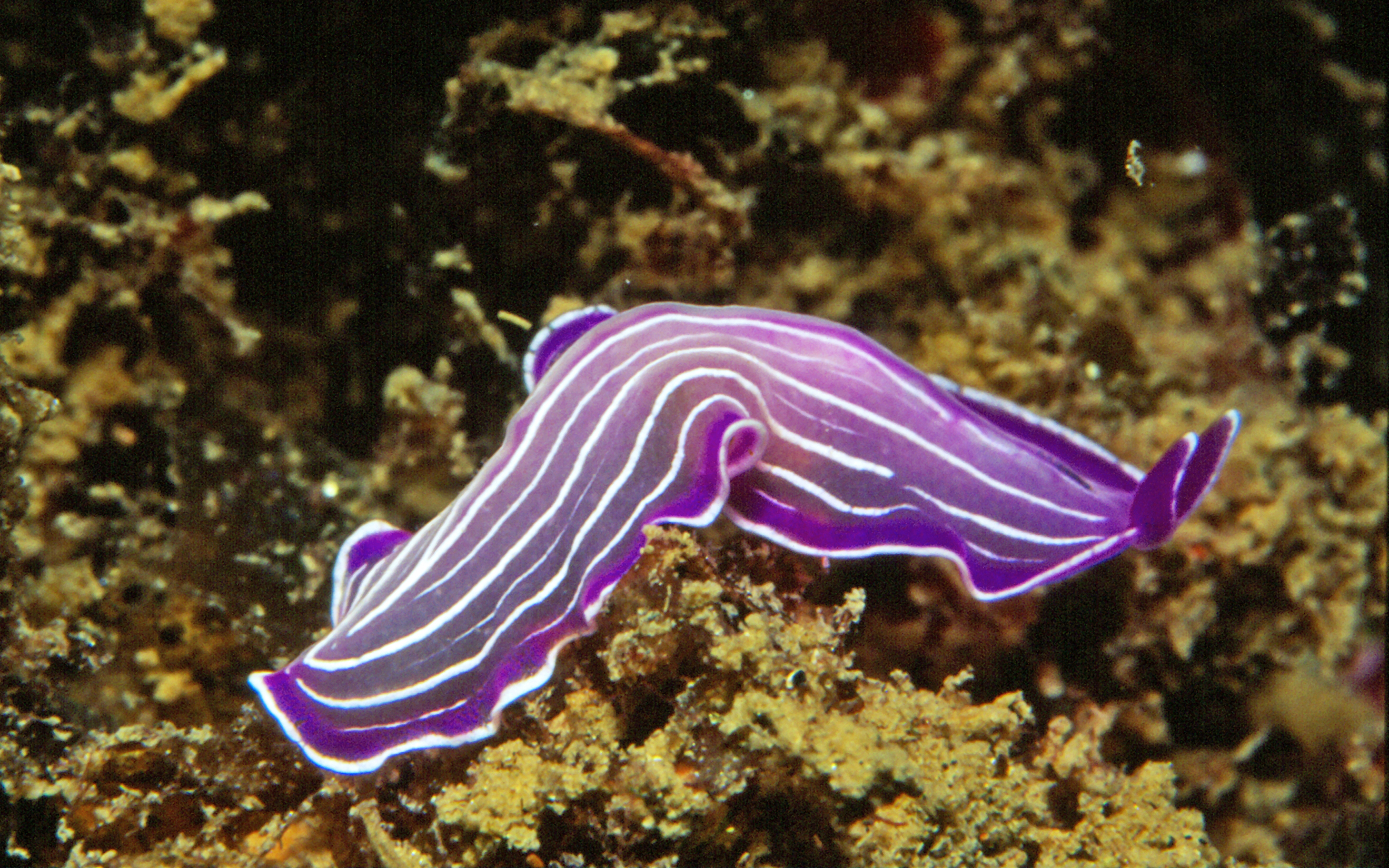
- Prostheceraeus roseus

Scientific classification
- Kingdom: Animalia
- Phylum: Platyhelminthes
- Order: Polycladida
- Suborder: Cotylea
- Family: Euryleptidae; Stimpson, 1857

Genera
- See text

= Euryleptidae =

Family of flatworms

Euryleptidae is a family of marine polyclad flatworms.

== Genera ==
The following genera are listed by the World Register of Marine Species:

- Genus Acerotisa Strand, 1928
- Genus Anciliplana Heath & McGregor, 1912
- Genus Ascidiophilla Newman, 2002
- Genus Cycloporus Lang, 1884
- Genus Eurylepta Ehrenberg, 1831
- Genus Katheurylepta Faubel, 1984
- Genus Leptoteredra Hallez, 1913
- Genus Maritigrella Newman & Cannon, 2000
- Genus Oligoclado Pearse, 1938
- Genus Oligocladus Lang, 1884
- Genus Parastylostomum Faubel, 1984
- Genus Pareurylepta Faubel, 1984
- Genus Praestheceraeus Faubel, 1984
- Genus Prostheceraeus Schmarda, 1859
- Genus Stygolepta Faubel, 1984

== Gallery ==
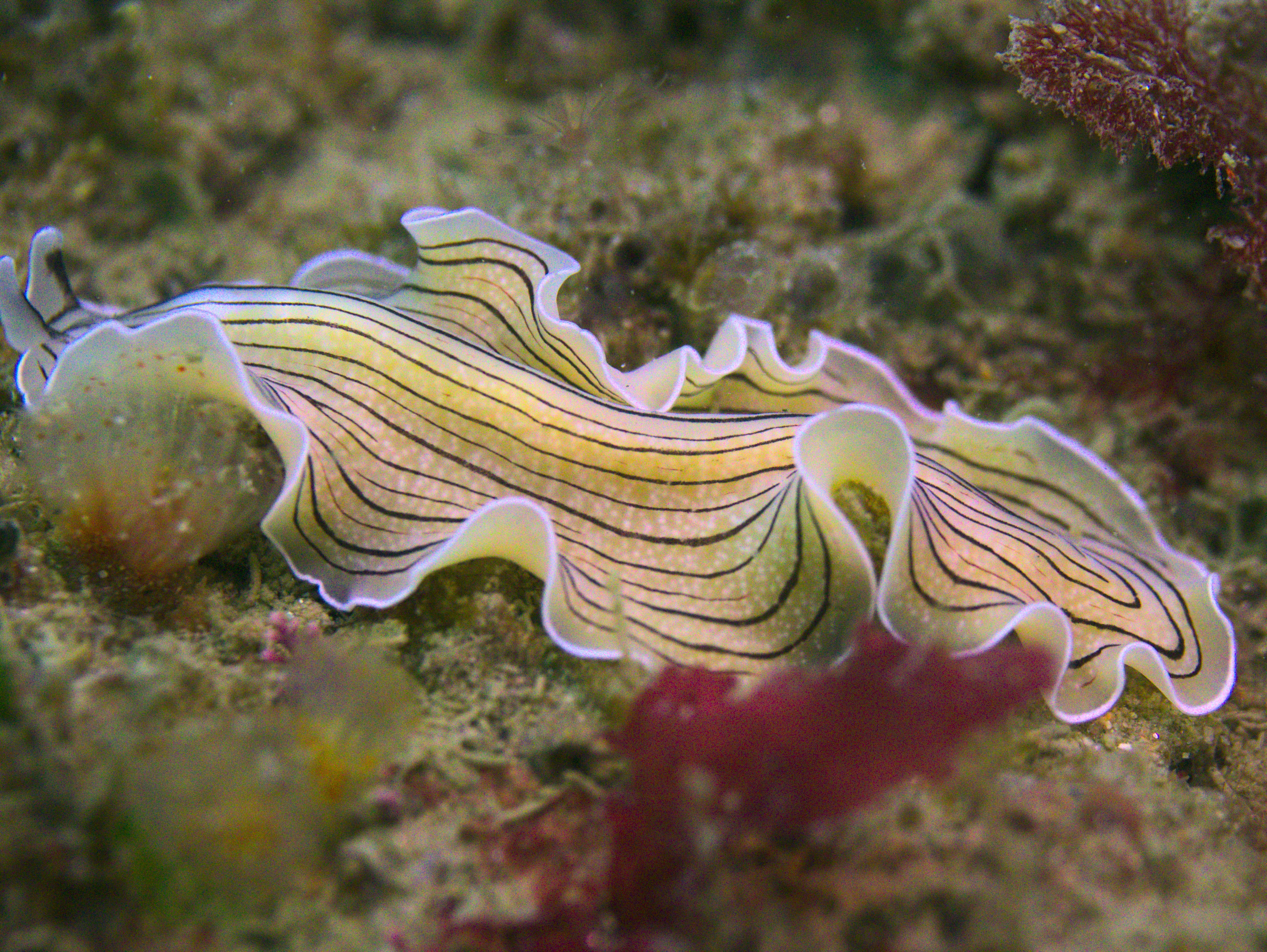
Prostheceraeus vittatus

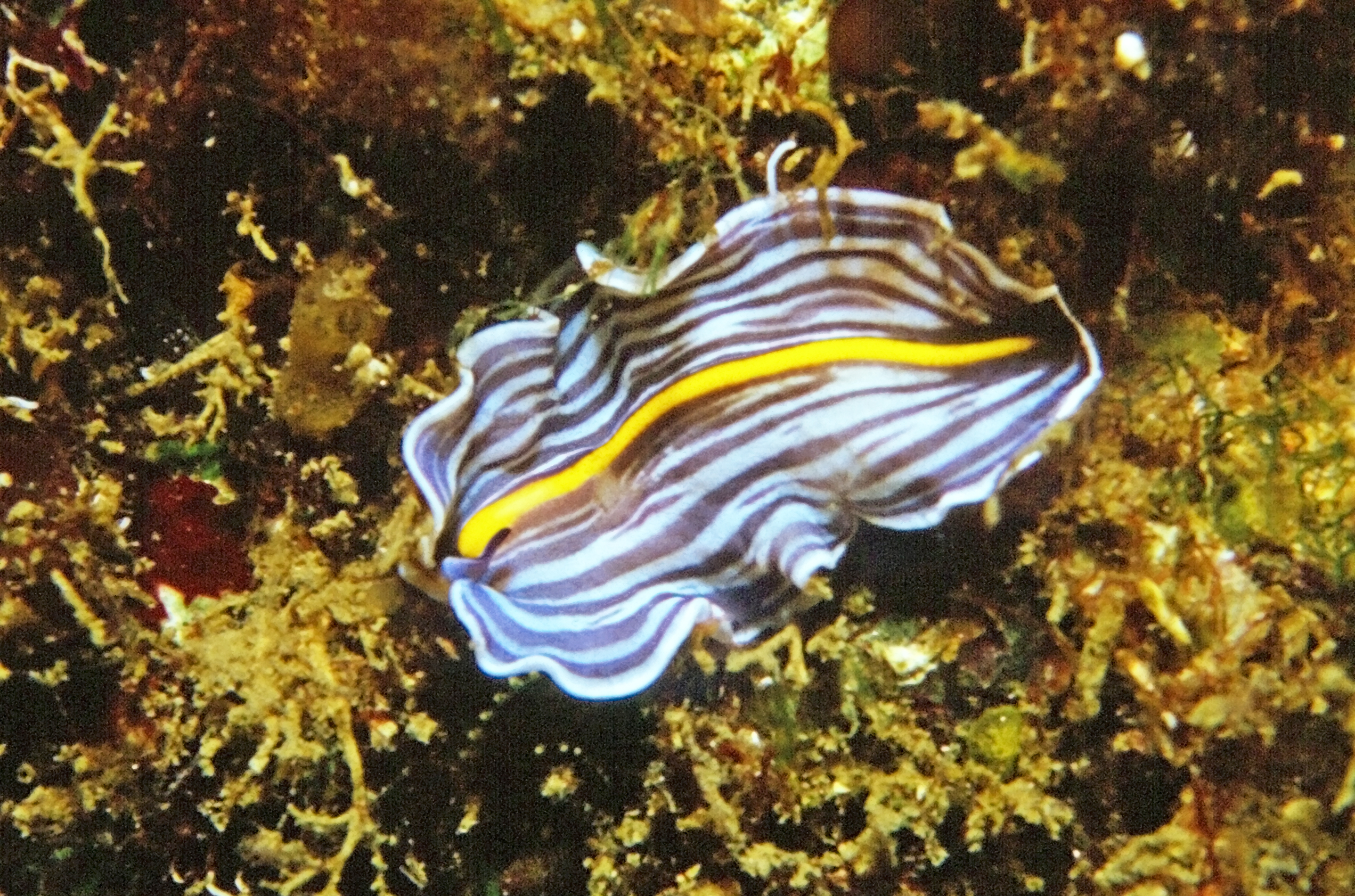
Prostheceraeus giesbrechtii

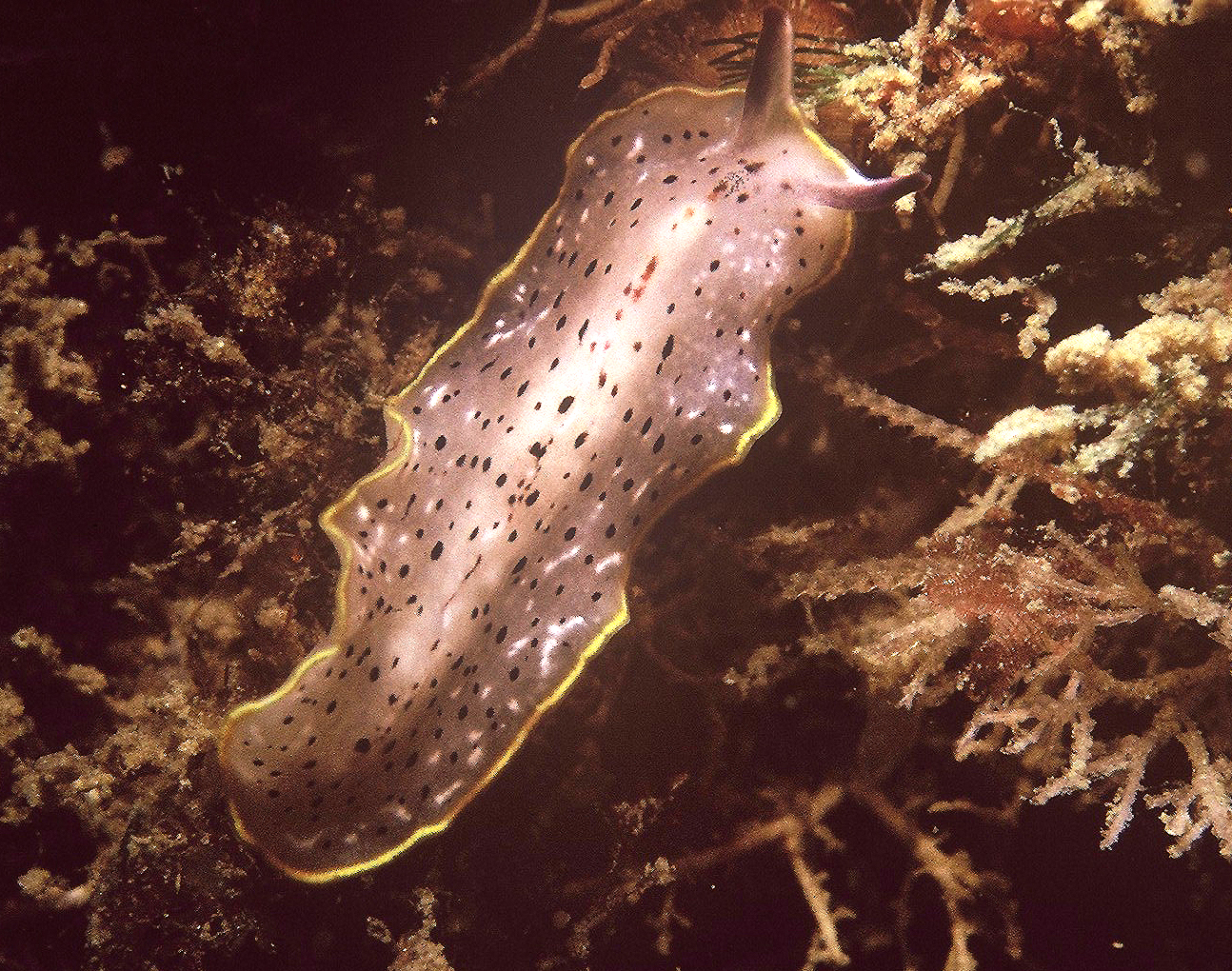
Prostheceraeus moseleyi

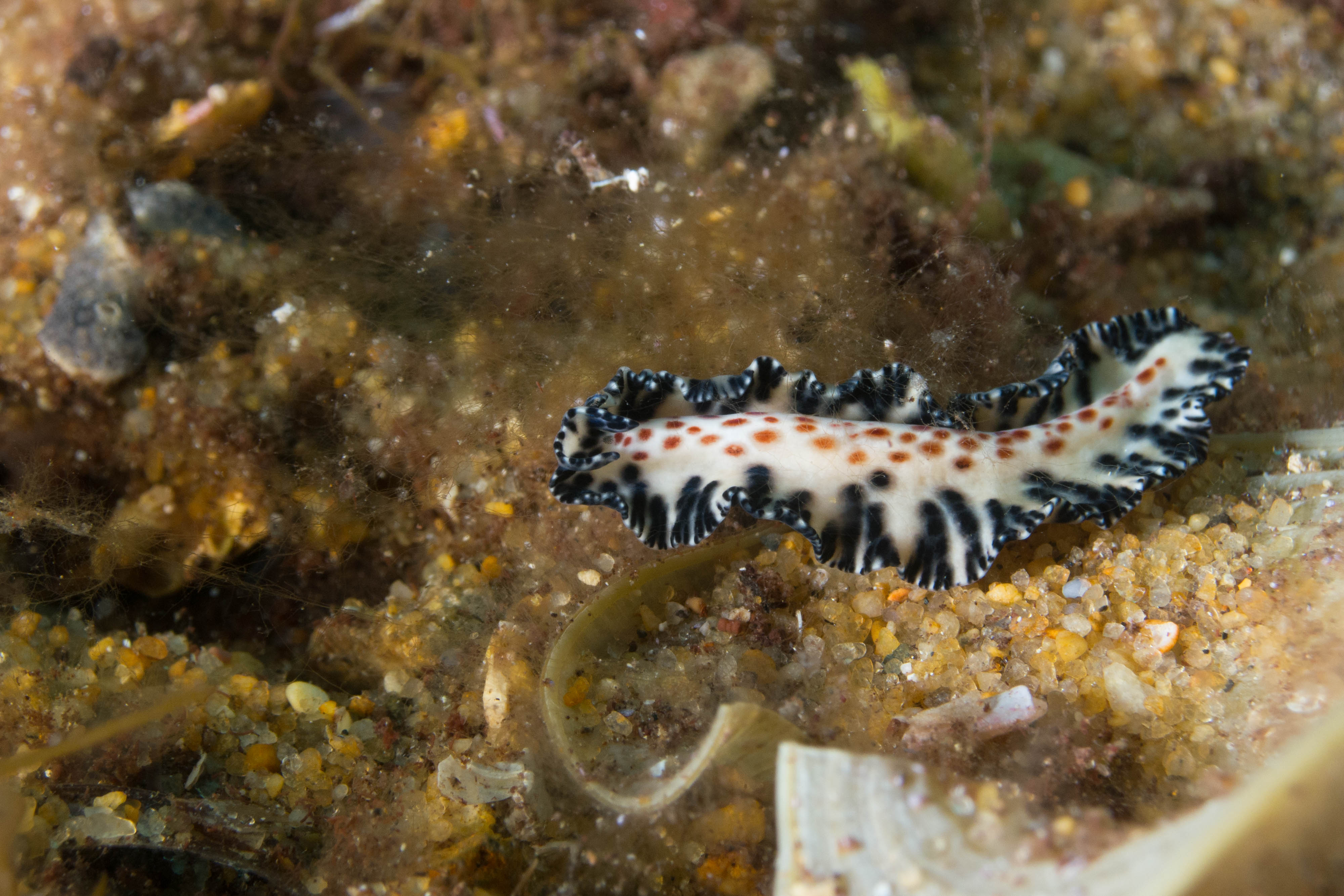
Maritigrella fuscopunctata

== See also ==
- Maritigrella crozierae - tiger flatworm
- Maritigrella fuscopunctata
- Prostheceraeus vittatus - candy striped flatworm
