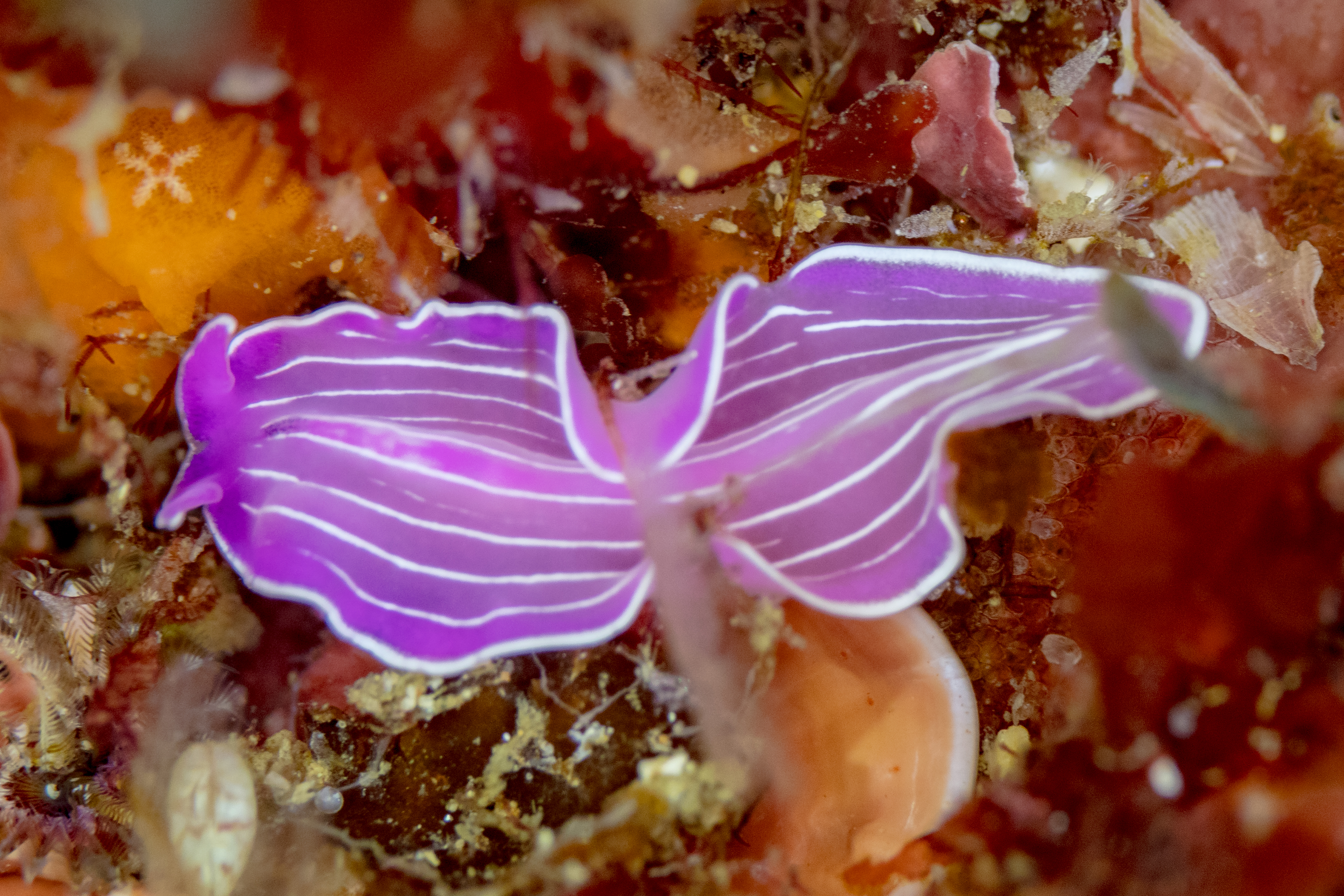
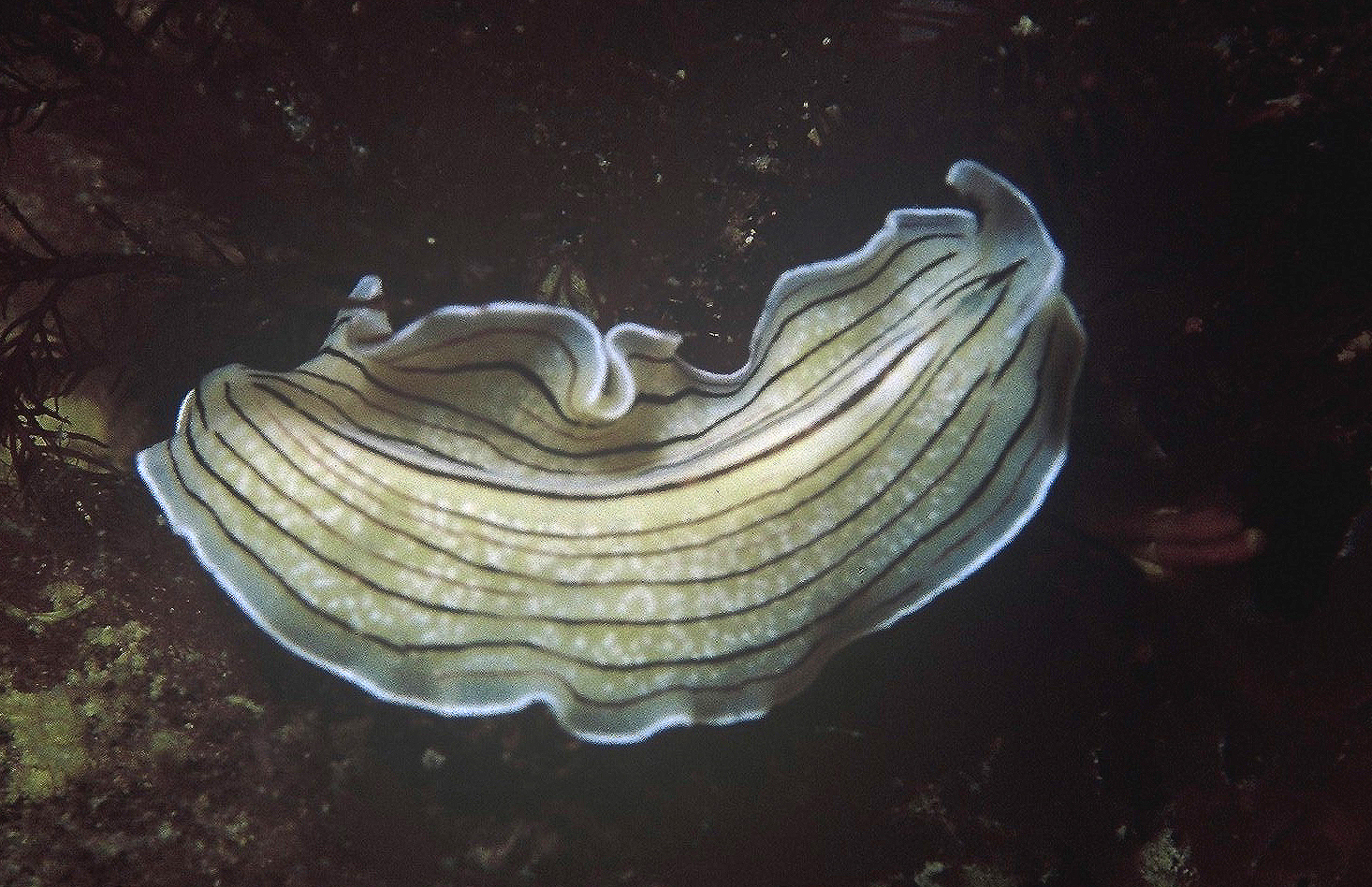
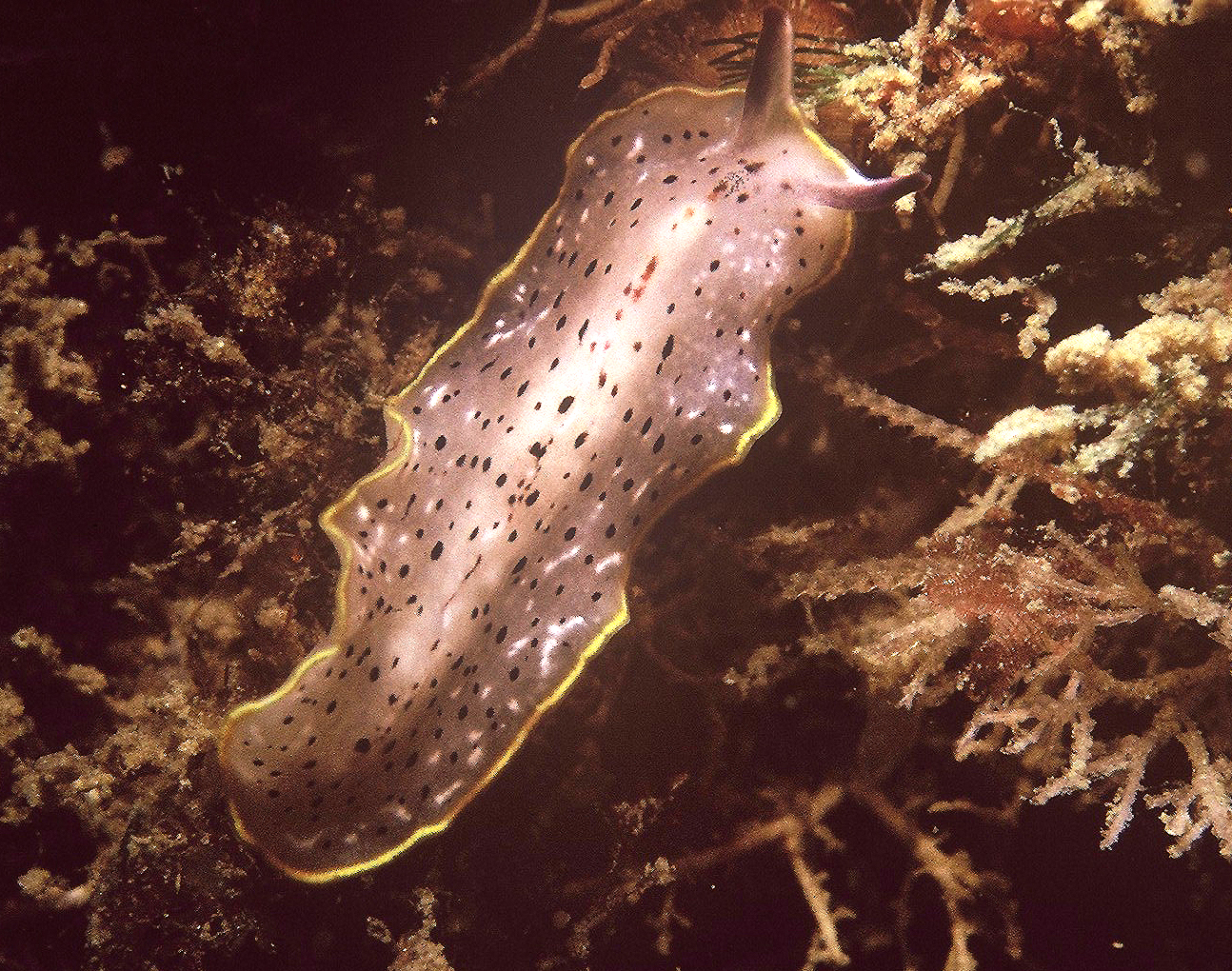
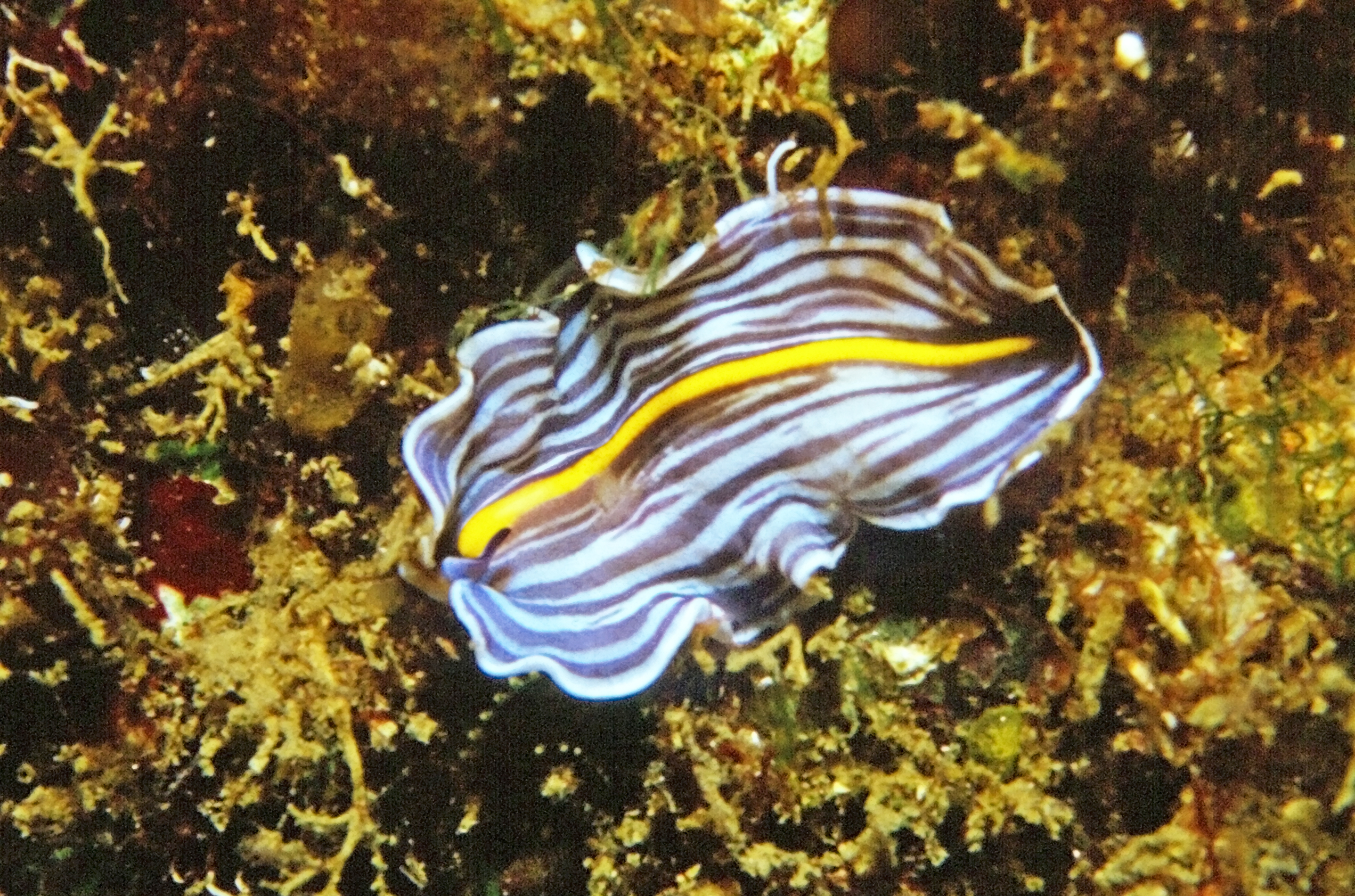
- From the left to right of each row, from top to bottom: Prostheceraeus roseus, Prostheceraeus vittatus, Prostheceraeus moseleyi, Prostheceraeus giesbrechtii

Scientific classification
- Kingdom: Animalia
- Phylum: Platyhelminthes
- Order: Polycladida
- Suborder: Cotylea
- Family: Euryleptidae
- Genus: Prostheceraeus; Schmarda, 1859

Type species
- Prostheceraeus nigricornus Schmarda, 1859

Species
- See Taxonomy

= Prostheceraeus =

Genus of flatworms

Prostheceraeus is a genus of flatworms in the family Euryleptidae.

== Taxonomy ==
The following species are recognised in the genus Prostheceraeus:

- P. albicinctus Lang, 1884
- P. anomalus Haswell, 1907
- P. argus (Quatrefage, 1845)
- P. boucheti Prudhoe, 1989
- P. crisostomum Cuadrado, Rodriguez, Moro, Grande & Noreña, 2021
- P. crozieri (Hyman, 1939)
- P. fitae Soutullo, Cuadrado & Noreña, 2021
- P. flavomarginatus (Ehrenberg, 1831)
- P. floridanus Hyman, 1955
- P. fuscolineatus Dixit, Raghunathan & Chandra, 2017
- P. giesbrechtii Lang, 1884
- P. maculosus (Verrill, 1892)
- P. meleagrinus (Kelaart, 1858)
- P. moseleyi Lang, 1884
- P. nigricornus Schmarda, 1859
- P. panamensis Woodworth, 1894
- P. pseudolimax Lang, 1884
- P. roseus Lang, 1884
- P. rubropunctatus Lang, 1884
- P. violaceus (Delle-Chiaje, 1822)
- P. vittatus (Montagu, 1815)
- P. zebra Hyman, 1955
