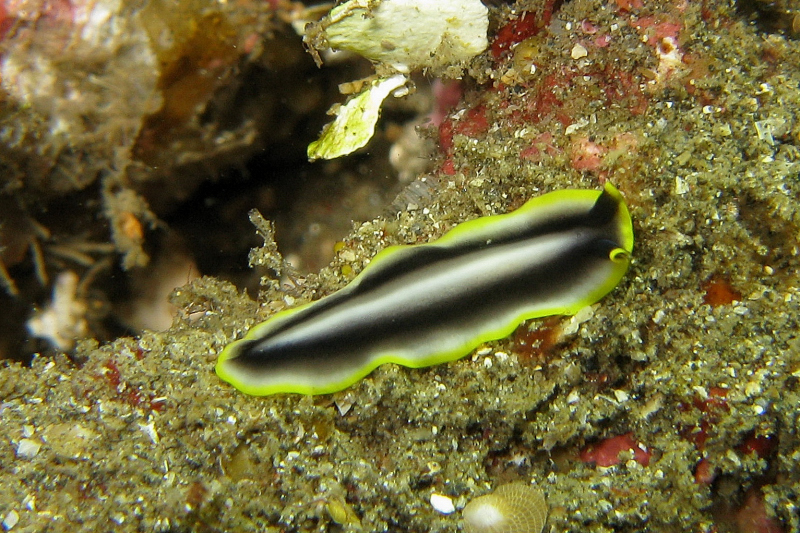
- Eurylepta sp.

Scientific classification
- Kingdom: Animalia
- Phylum: Platyhelminthes
- Order: Polycladida
- Suborder: Cotylea
- Family: Euryleptidae
- Genus: Eurylepta; Ehrenberg, 1831

Type species
- Eurylepta cornuta (O. F. Müller, 1776)

= Eurylepta =

Genus of flatworms

Eurylepta is a genus of free-living marine flatworms (polyclads) in the family Euryleptidae.

== Characteristics ==
Eurylepta is a morphologically diverse group of flatworms in the class Turbellaria that live freely in marine environments, as opposed to parasitic flatworms of other classes (Monogenea, Trematoda, Cestoda). The genus was originally described as flat, with a discrete mouth and anus, eye clusters on the neck, two tentaculiform folds at the front, and a posterior ovary. Eurylepta are hermaphroditic, possessing an armed penis with a tubular stylet. Further characteristics include a forward-pointing pharynx, the mouth directly behind the brain, and a lack of digestive tract. Not much of their feeding habits has been recorded, however, Eurylepta leoparda is a well-known predator of ascidians.

== Taxonomy & Distribution ==
Ehrenberg first described the genus Eurylepta along with two new species, E. praetexta and E. flavomarginata, which have since been moved to the Prostheceraeus and Pseudoceros genera respectively. Ehrenberg and Hemprich observed the individuals among corals in the Red Sea, during their travels in Arabia. Since then, new species of Eurylepta have been described in off-shore marine environments globally. Georeferenced records and observations can be found in the Global Biodiversity Information Facility (GBIF) and iNaturalist.

Below are the 18 accepted species under the genus Eurylepta, according to the World Register of Marine Species.

Species	Distribution	Image
Eurylepta alba (Freeman, 1933)	West Coast of America	
Eurylepta alicula Pitale & Apte, 2021	West Coast of India, Andaman Islands	
Eurylepta aurantiaca Heath & McGregor, 1912	Global Distribution	
Eurylepta baeckstroemi (Bock, 1923)	Northeastern Pacific, Chilean Coast	
Eurylepta californica Hyman, 1959	West Coast of America	
Eurylepta cornuta (O. F. Müller, 1776)	European Coasts	
Eurylepta fulvolimbata Grube, 1867	Central South Pacific	
Eurylepta guayota Cuadrado, Moro & Norena, 2017	Canary Islands	
Eurylepta herberti Kirk, 1882	Cook Strait, near South Pacific	
Eurylepta leoparda Freeman, 1933	West Coast of America	
Eurylepta meridiana (Ritter-Zahony, 1907)	Southeastern Pacific, Chilean Coast	
Eurylepta multicelis (Hyman, 1955)	Florida, North Atlantic	
Eurylepta neptis Du Bois-Reymond Marcus, 1955	Brazilian Coast, South Atlantic	
Eurylepta pantherina Grube, 1867	Central South Pacific	
Eurylepta piscatoria (Marcus, 1947)	Brazilian Coast, South Atlantic	
Eurylepta rugosa (Hyman, 1959)	Palau Islands, Central Indo-Pacific	
Eurylepta turma Marcus, 1952	Brazilian Coast, South Atlantic	
Eurylepta violacea (Kelaart, 1858)	Indian Ocean	
