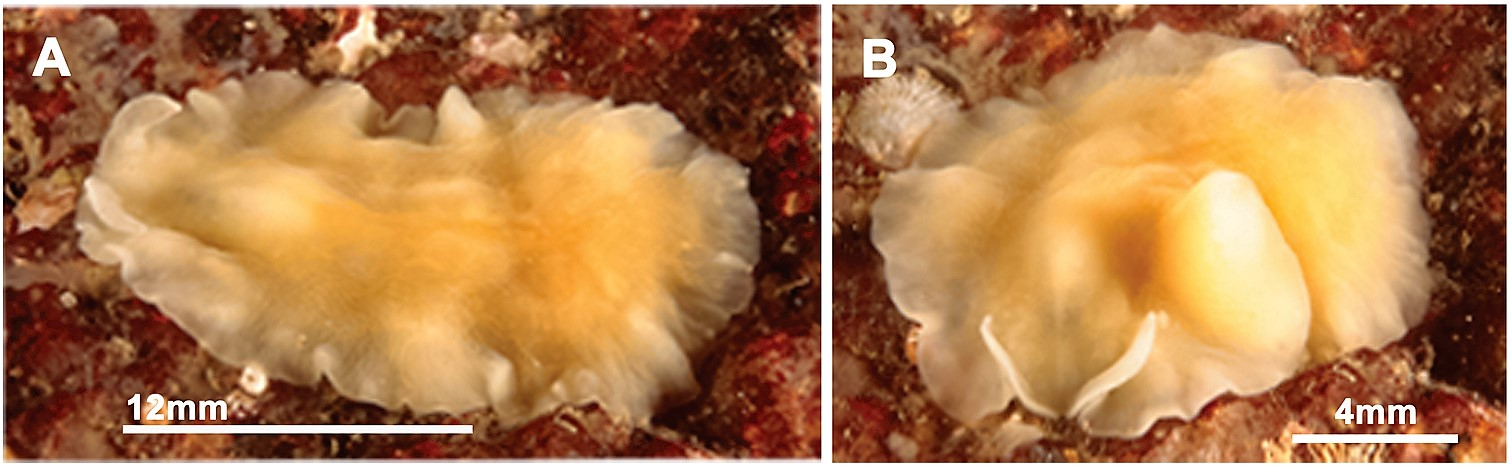
- Euryleptodes galikias

Scientific classification
- Kingdom: Animalia
- Phylum: Platyhelminthes
- Order: Polycladida
- Suborder: Cotylea
- Family: Stylostomidae
- Genus: Euryleptodes; Heath & McGregor, 1912

Type species
- Euryleptodes cavicola Heath & McGregor, 1912

Species
- See Taxonomy

= Euryleptodes =

Genus of flatworms

Euryleptodes is a genus of flatworms in the family Stylostomidae.

== Taxonomy ==
The following species are recognised in the genus Euryleptodes:

- E. cavicola Heath & McGregor, 1912
- E. galikias Norena, Marquina, Perez & Almon, 2014
- E. insularis Hyman, 1953
- E. pannulus Heath & McGregor, 1912
- E. phyllulus Heath & McGregor, 1912
