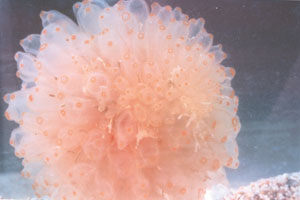
- Colony of zooids

Scientific classification
- Kingdom: Animalia
- Phylum: Chordata
- Subphylum: Tunicata
- Class: Ascidiacea
- Order: Phlebobranchia
- Family: Perophoridae
- Genus: Ecteinascidia
- Species: E. turbinata

Binomial name
- Ecteinascidia turbinata Herdman, 1880

Synonyms
- Ecteinascidia moorei Herdman, 1891

= Ecteinascidia turbinata =

Species of sea squirt

Ecteinascidia turbinata, commonly known as the mangrove tunicate, is a species of tunicate in the family Perophoridae. It was described to science in 1880 by William Abbott Herdman. Two cancer drugs can be formulated from this species, trabectedin (sold under Yondelis) and lurbinectedin (sold by Zebzelca). Both drugs were produced by PharmaMar.

== Description ==
Ecteinascidia turbinata is a colonial sea squirt. The individual zooids can grow to a height of 2.5 cm (1 in) and are shaped like wide-necked bottles. They are connected by a stolon at the base through which blood circulates between the zooids and which serves to attach the colony to the substrate. The walls of the zooids are known as tunics and are strengthened with cellulose, which is unusual for an animal. They are connected to the outside water by siphons. The walls of the tunic are translucent and the pharyngeal basket can be seen through them. The siphon margins are orange because of the deposition of carotenoids there. This is a warning colour, for E. turbinata is distasteful, and deters predators. Colonies can reach a width of 14 centimetres (5.5 in).

== Distribution and habitat ==
Ecteinascidia turbinata is found all the year round in shallow waters in the Caribbean Sea, the east coast of Florida, Bermuda and the Gulf of Mexico. In the summer it is occasionally found in Chesapeake Bay, off the coasts of North and South Carolina and in the Mediterranean Sea. It primarily grows on the submerged roots of mangroves (Rhizophora mangle). In Cuba, where it is abundant, it has been found at densities of one colony per metre of mangrove root. It is also found growing on rocks, jetties, the coral genus Antipathes, floating debris and on or around seagrasses.

== Biology ==
Ecteinascidia turbinata is a filter feeder. Each zooid draws water into its interior through the inhalant siphon at the top and expels it through the exhalant siphon. Food particles, mostly plankton, get trapped in mucus as the water passes through a mesh-like pharyngeal basket. From here the particles are moved by cilia to the U-shaped gut. Undigested remains get expelled through the anus near the exhalent siphon where they get carried away by the water current.

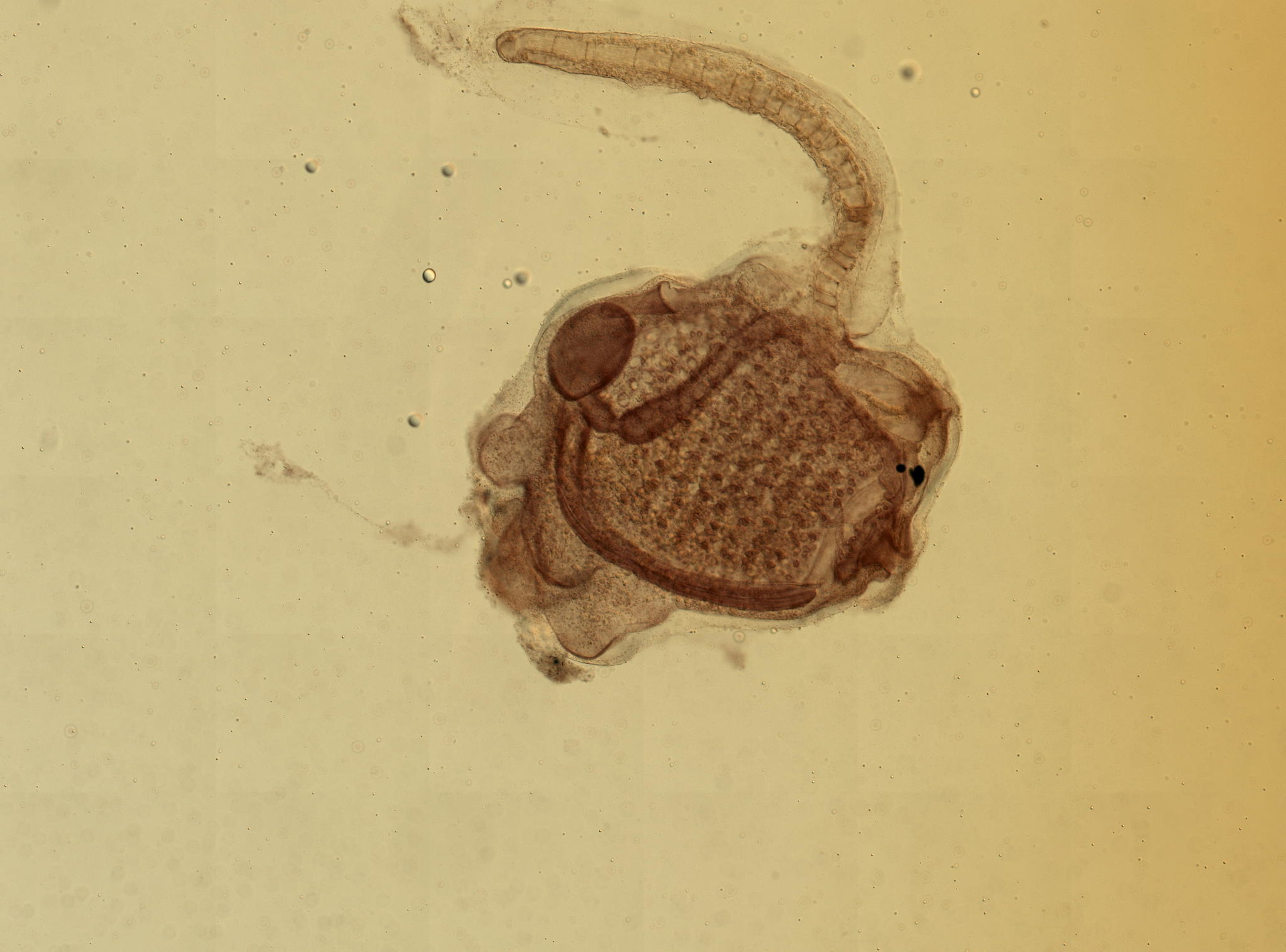
Individual zooid

The colony can grow by budding, a form of asexual reproduction, new zooids growing from the stolon. In spring and early summer, sexual reproduction takes place. Ecteinascidia turbinata is a simultaneous hermaphrodite with eggs and sperm being produced by each individual. After fertilisation, the eggs are brooded in the body cavity for about a week. They then develop into bright yellow, tadpole-like larvae with a distinct notochord which pass out into the water column. They can swim and have a yolk on which they feed for several days. When this is exhausted they need to find a suitable place to settle and metamorphosize into a juvenile sea squirt, ready to start a new colony.

== Ecology ==
Vanadium compounds accumulate in the tunic of Ecteinascidia turbinata such that the total vanadium concentration of the tunic can be one million times higher than that of the surrounding sea water. The function of these substances is uncertain but when combined with certain alkaloids, they render the tunicate distasteful to predators, and the organism's bright orange colouring advertises this. The flatworm Maritigrella crozierae seems immune to the sea squirt's noxious chemicals and is able to crawl over the surface of the colony and insert a long pharynx into individual zooids to feed on their internal structures.

Other biofouling organisms living in the vicinity of Ecteinascidia turbinata include various marine sponges and other species of tunicates. Several species of amphipod exist symbiotically inside the zooids.

One of the alkaloids produced by a bacterial symbiont of Ecteinascidia turbinata is Ecteinascidin 743, also known as trabectedin, which has been found to have antitumor antibiotic properties and has been approved by EU and US drug regulators under the trade name "Yondelis" for treatment of certain soft tissue sarcomas and recurrent ovarian cancer.
