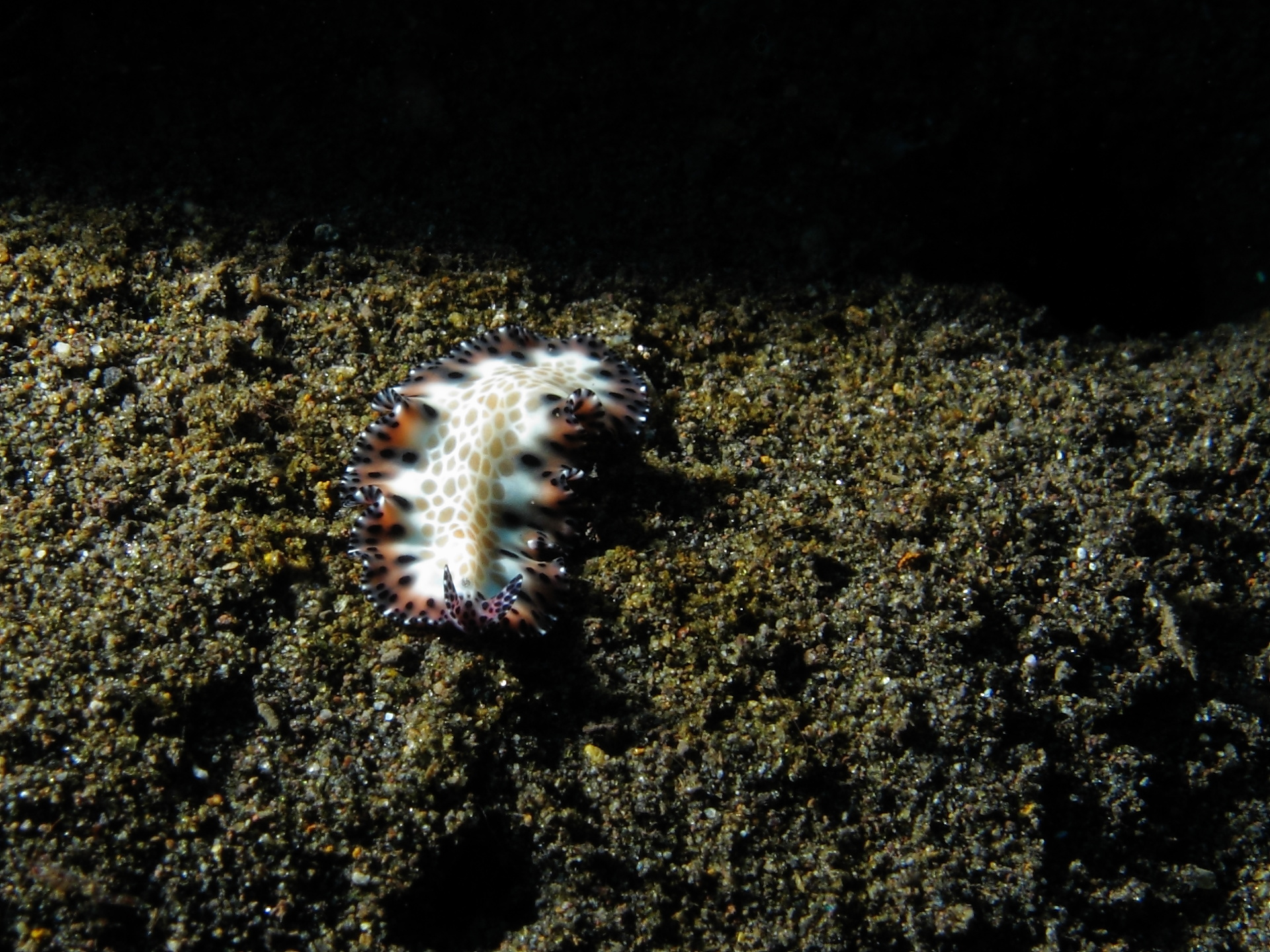
- M. fuscopunctata near Komodo, Indonesia

Scientific classification
- Domain: Eukaryota
- Kingdom: Animalia
- Phylum: Platyhelminthes
- Order: Polycladida
- Family: Euryleptidae
- Genus: Maritigrella
- Species: M. fuscopunctata

Binomial name
- Maritigrella fuscopunctata Prudhoe, 1977

= Maritigrella fuscopunctata =

Species of flatworm

Maritigrella fuscopunctata is a species of marine polyclad flatworm in the family Euryleptidae from Indo-Pacific.
