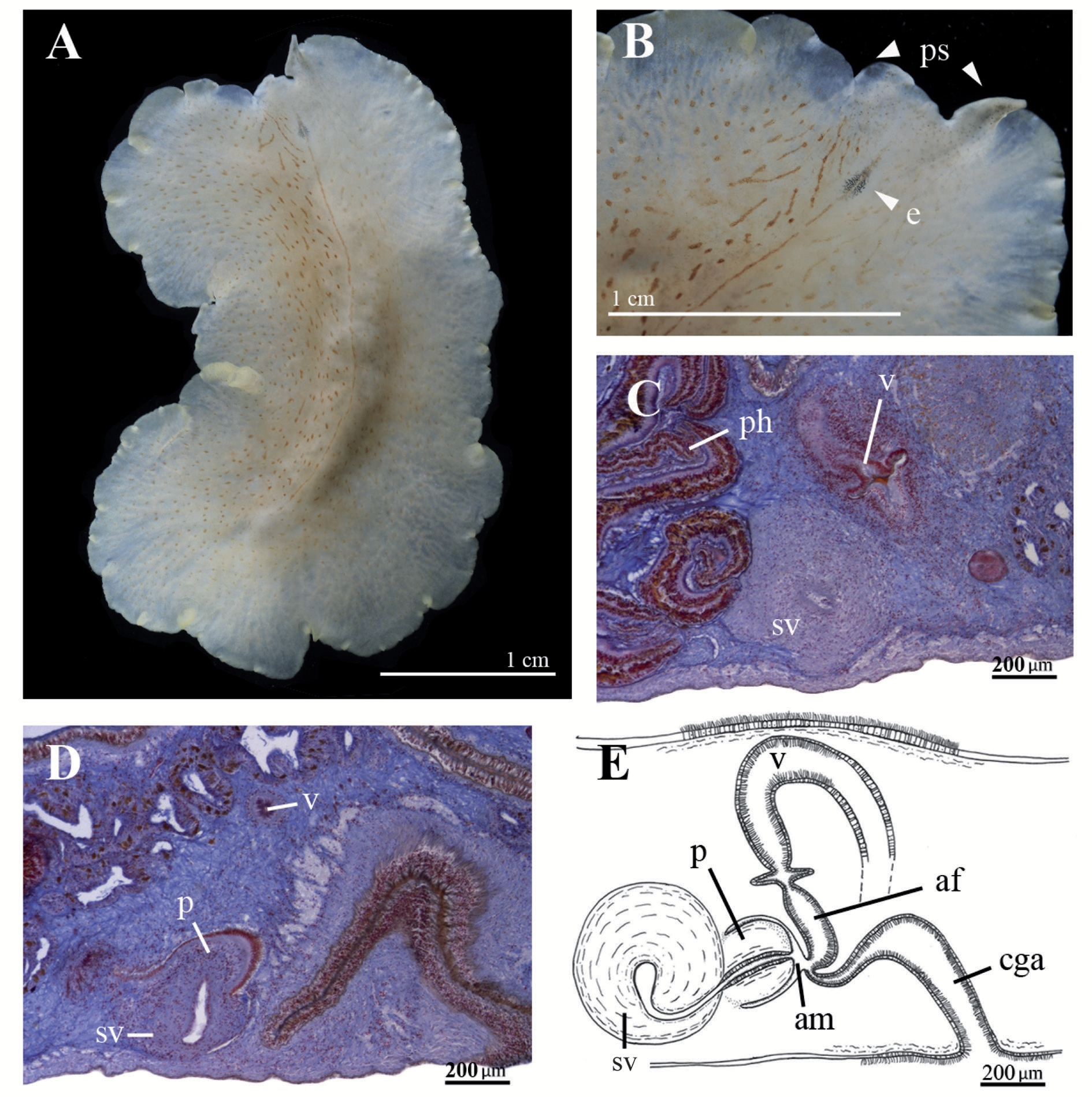
- Marcusia alba in dorsal view (A). Anterior region with cerebral eyes cluster and pseudotentacles (white arrows) (B). Histological sections of the male and female copulatory organs, respectively (C-D). Sagittal reconstruction of the reproduction system (E).

Scientific classification
- Kingdom: Animalia
- Phylum: Platyhelminthes
- Order: Polycladida
- Suborder: Cotylea
- Family: Anonymidae
- Genus: Marcusia; Hyman, 1953

Type species
- Marcusia ernesti Hyman, 1953

Species
- See Taxonomy

= Marcusia =

Genus of flatworms

Marcusia is a genus of flatworms in the family Anonymidae.

== Taxonomy ==
The following species are recognised in the genus Marcusia:

- M. alba Cuadrado, Rodriguez, Moro, Grande & Noreña, 2021
- M. ernesti Hyman, 1953
