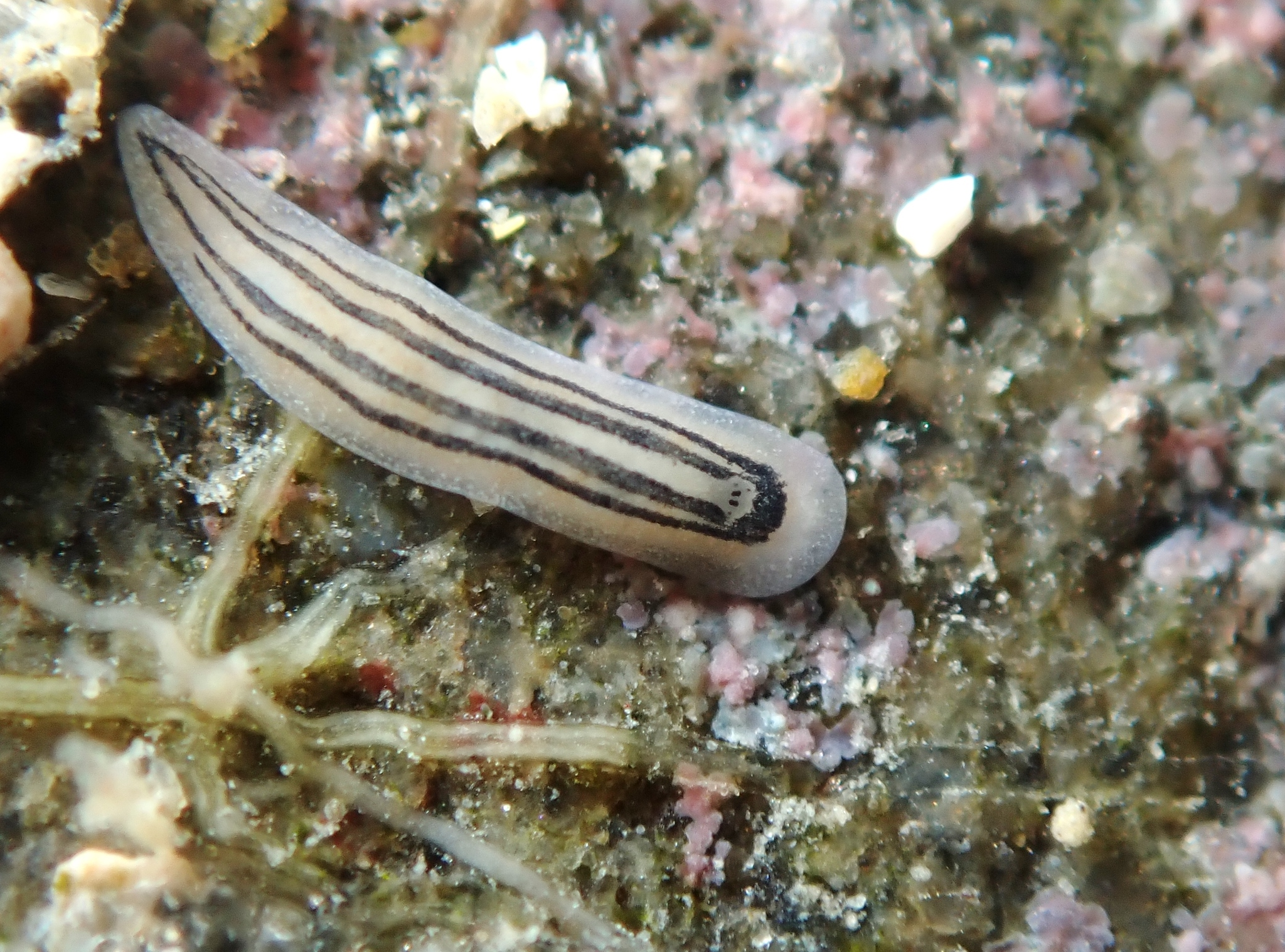
- Chromoplana kaikouris
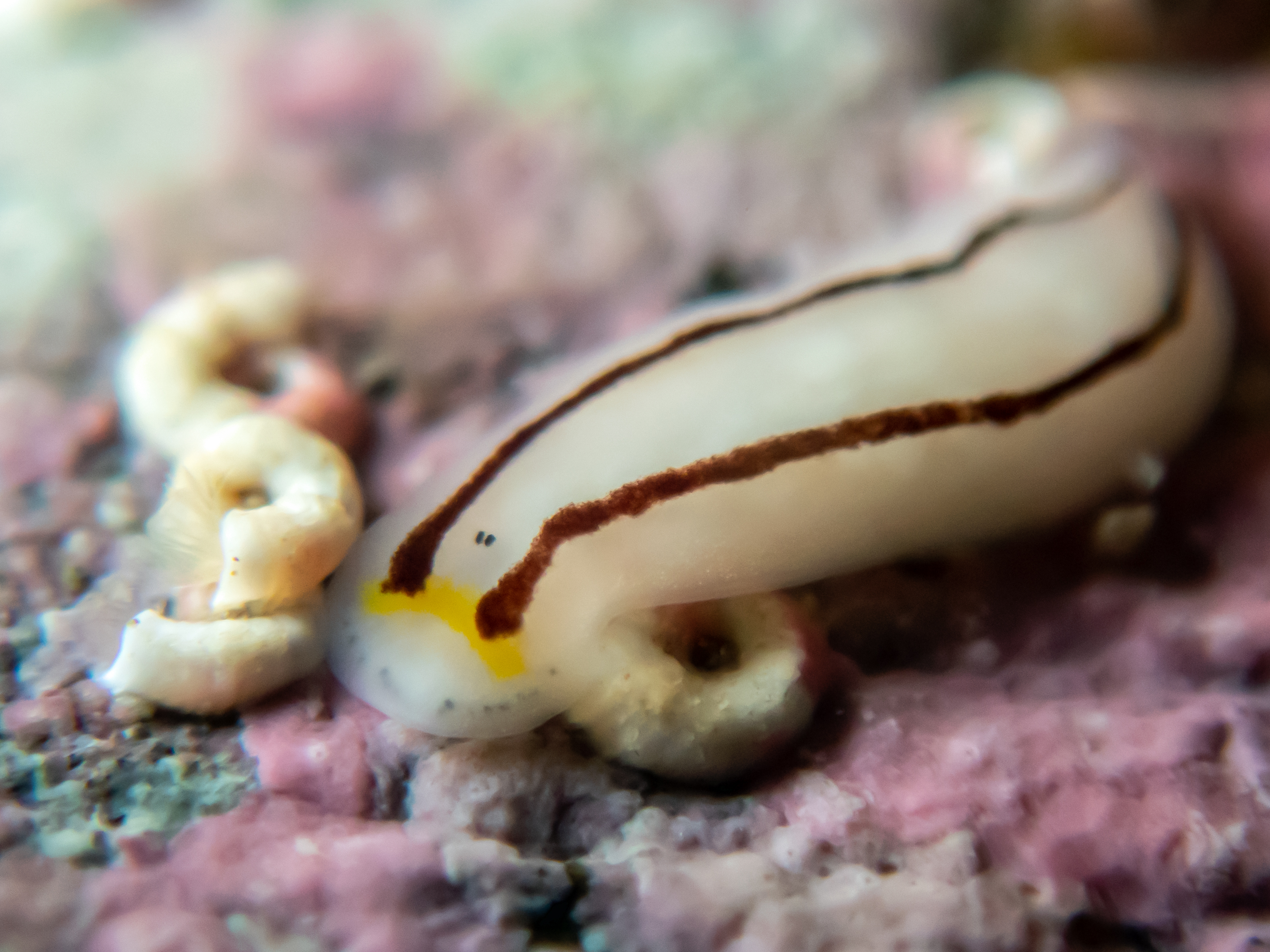
- Chromoplana sirena

Scientific classification
- Kingdom: Animalia
- Phylum: Platyhelminthes
- Order: Polycladida
- Suborder: Cotylea
- Family: Chromoplanidae; Bock, 1922
- Genus: Chromoplana; Bock, 1922

Type species
- Chromoplana bella Bock, 1922

Species
- See Taxonomy

= Chromoplana =

Genus of flatworms

Chromoplana is a genus of flatworms and the only member of the family Chromoplanidae. The first described specimen was recovered from Japan.

== Taxonomy ==
The following species are recognised in the genus Chromoplana:

- C. bella Bock, 1922
- C. kaikouris Holleman, 2007
- C. sirena Holleman, 2007
