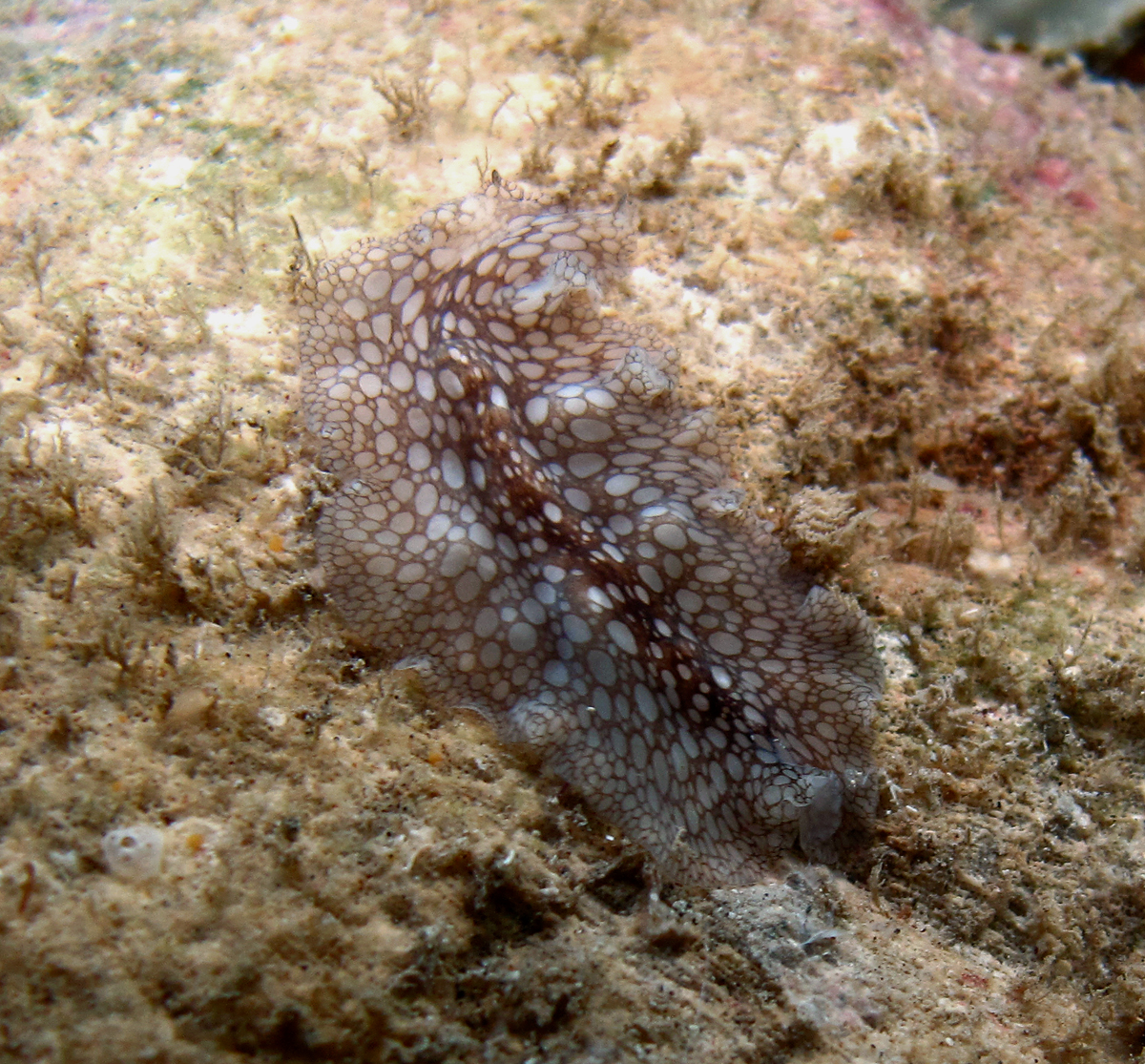
- Pericelis sp. from Réunion
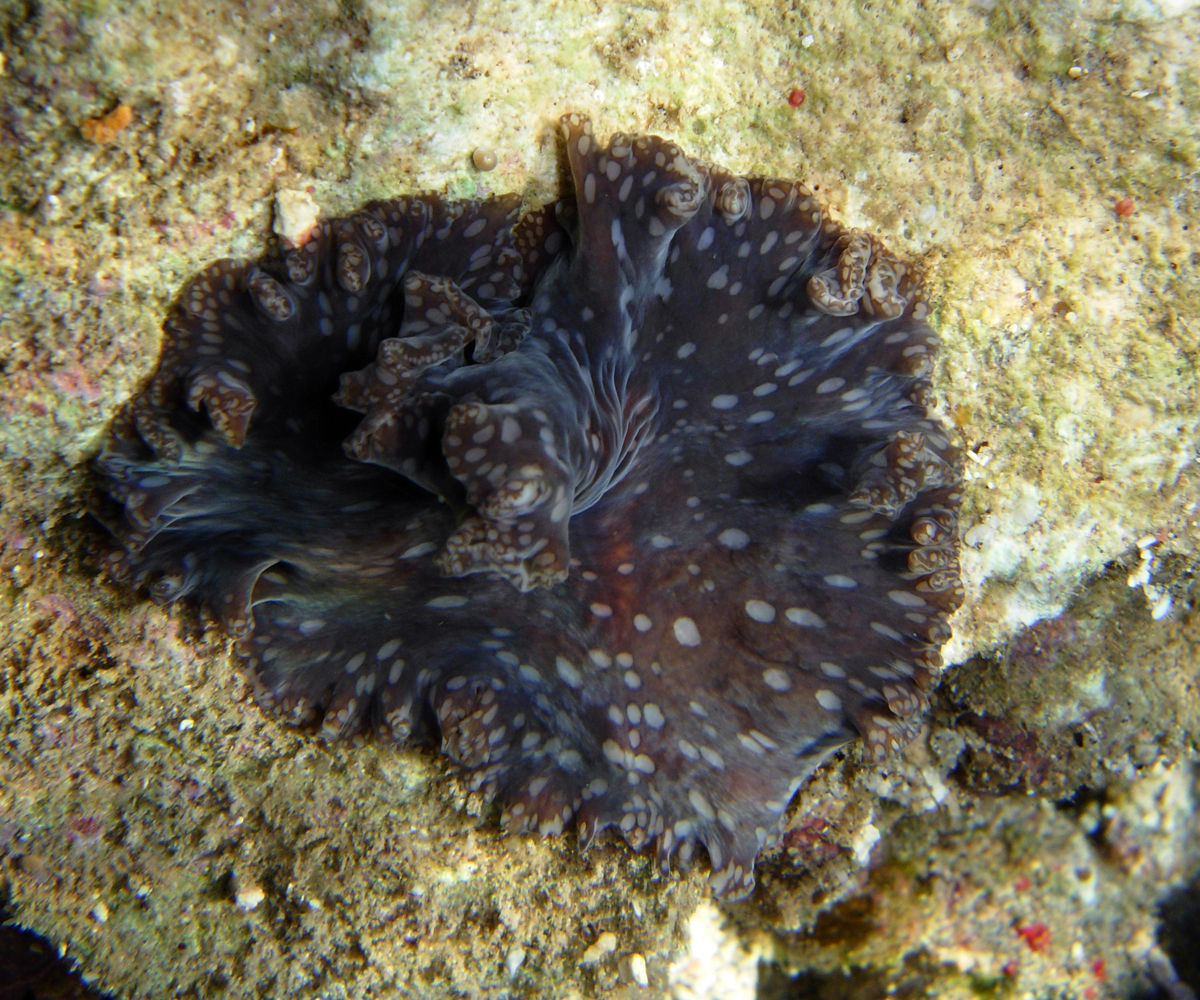
- Pericelis sp. from Réunion

Scientific classification
- Kingdom: Animalia
- Phylum: Platyhelminthes
- Order: Polycladida
- Suborder: Cotylea
- Superfamily: Periceloidea; Bahia, Padula & Schrödl, 2017
- Family: Pericelidae; Laidlaw, 1902
- Genus: Pericelis; Laidlaw, 1902

Type species
- Pericelis byerleyana (Collingwood, 1876) Laidlaw, 1902

Species
- See Taxonomy

= Pericelis =

Genus of flatworms

Pericelis is a genus of flatworms and the only member of the family Pericelidae, the only family in the superfamily Periceloidea.

== Taxonomy ==
The following species are recognised in the genus Pericelis:

- P. alba (Cuadrado, Rodriguez, Moro, Grande & Noreña, 2021)
- P. byerleyana (Collingwood, 1876) Laidlaw, 1902
- P. cata Er. Marcus & Ev. Marcus, 1968
- P. flavomarginata Tsuyuki, Oya, Jimi & Kajihara, 2020
- P. hymanae Poulter, 1974
- P. lactea Tsuyuki, Oya & Kajihara, 2021
- P. maculosa Tsuyuki, Oya & Kajihara, 2021
- P. nazahui Ramos-Sanchez, Bahia & Rolando Bastida-Zavala, 2020
- P. nivea Oya, Moritaki, & Tsuyuki, 2024
- P. orbicularia (Schmarda, 1859)
- P. sigmeri Ramos-Sanchez, Bahia & Rolando Bastida-Zavala, 2020
- P. tectivorum Dittmann, Dibiasi, Noreña & Egger, 2019
