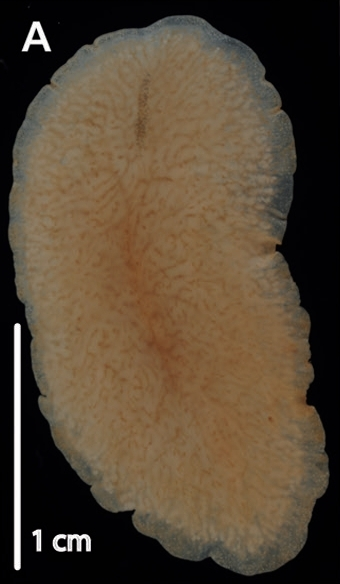
- Anonymus ruber from Cape Verde

Scientific classification
- Kingdom: Animalia
- Phylum: Platyhelminthes
- Order: Polycladida
- Suborder: Cotylea
- Family: Anonymidae
- Genus: Anonymus; Lang, 1884

Type species
- Anonymus virilis Lang, 1884

Species
- See Taxonomy

= Anonymus (flatworm) =

Genus of flatworms

Anonymus is a genus of flatworms in the family Anonymidae.

== Taxonomy ==
The following species are recognised in the genus Anonymus:

- A. kaikourensis Holleman, 1998
- A. multivirilis Holleman, 1998
- A. ruber Cuadrado, Moro & Norena, 2017
- A. virilis Lang, 1884
