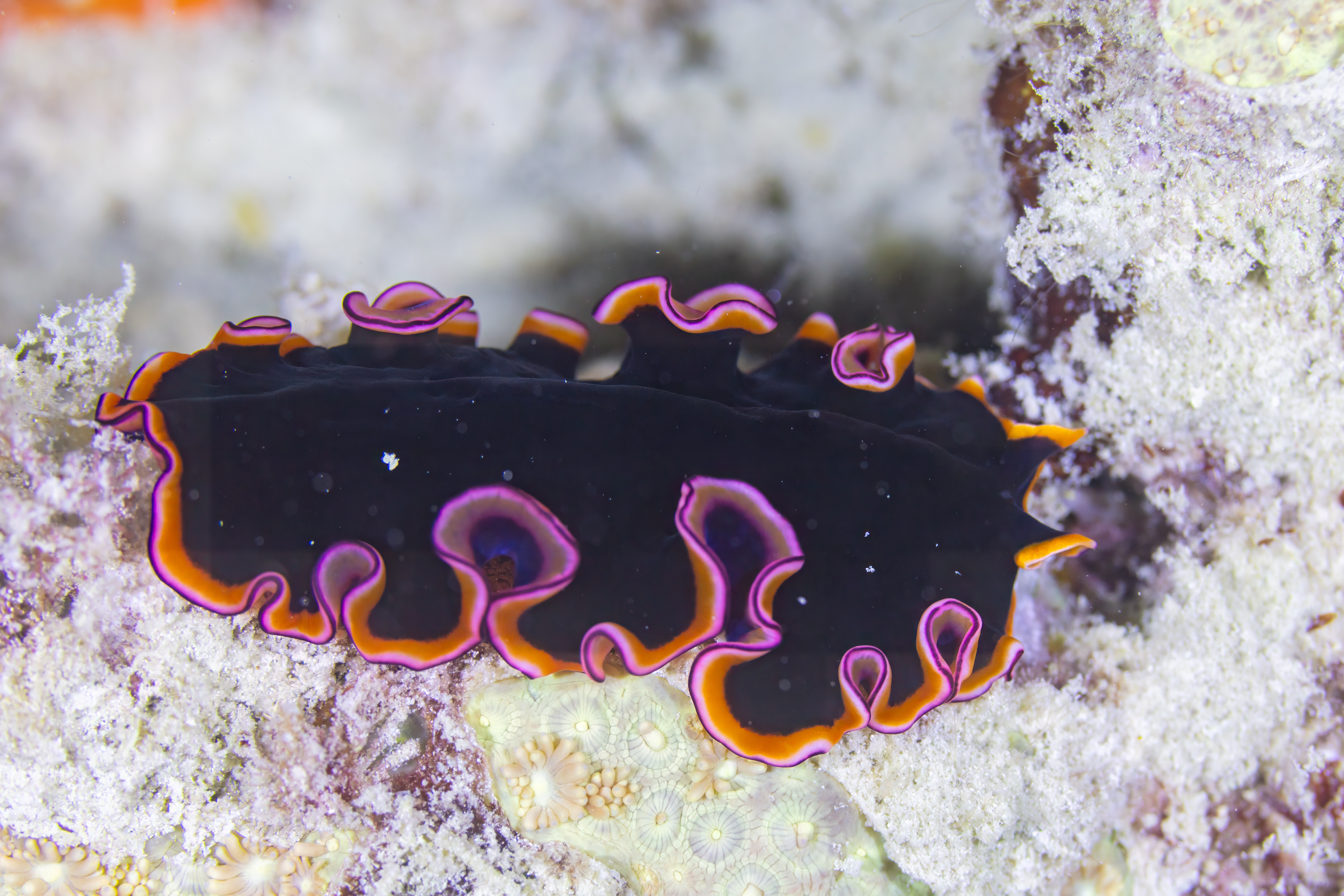
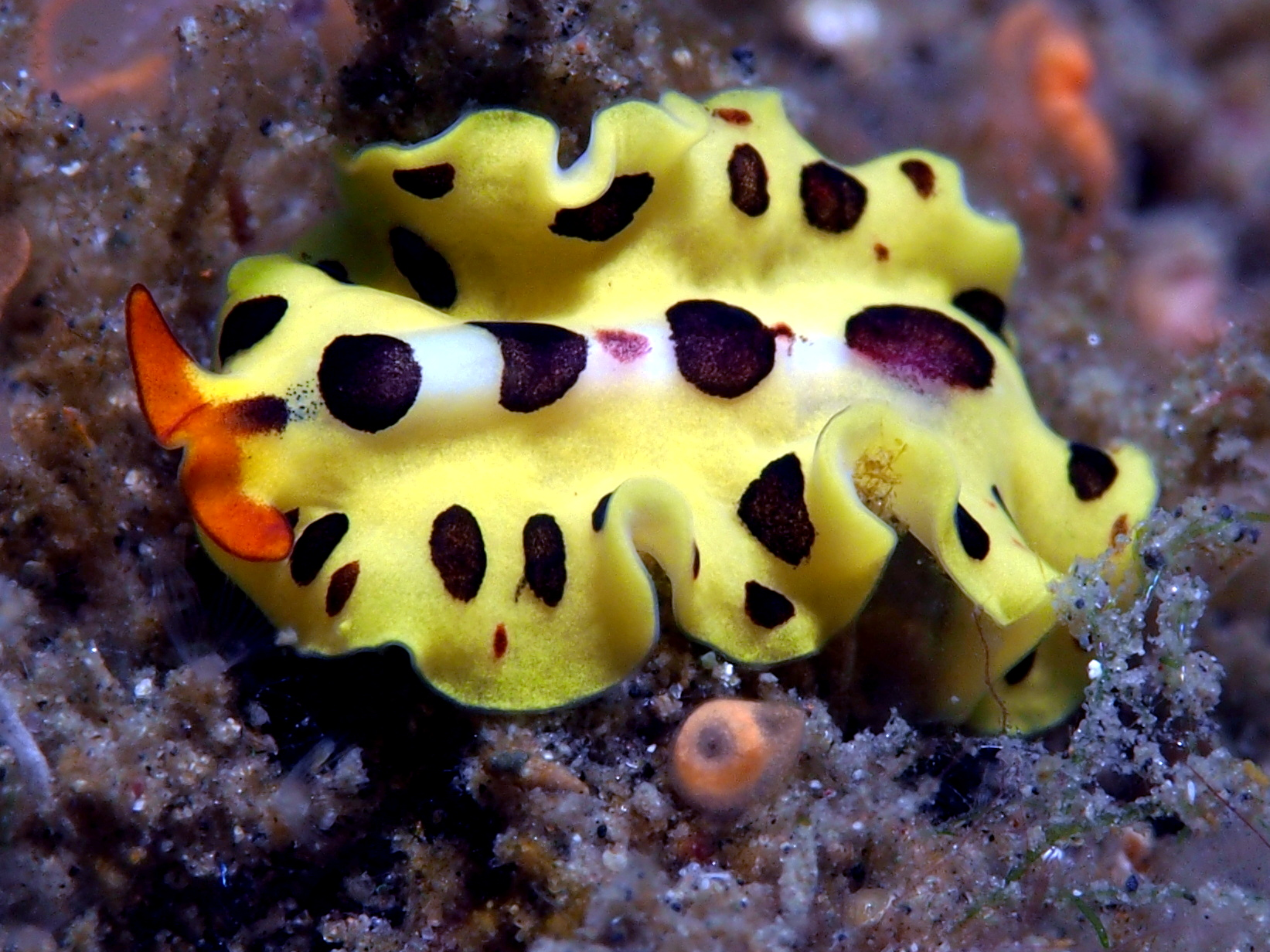
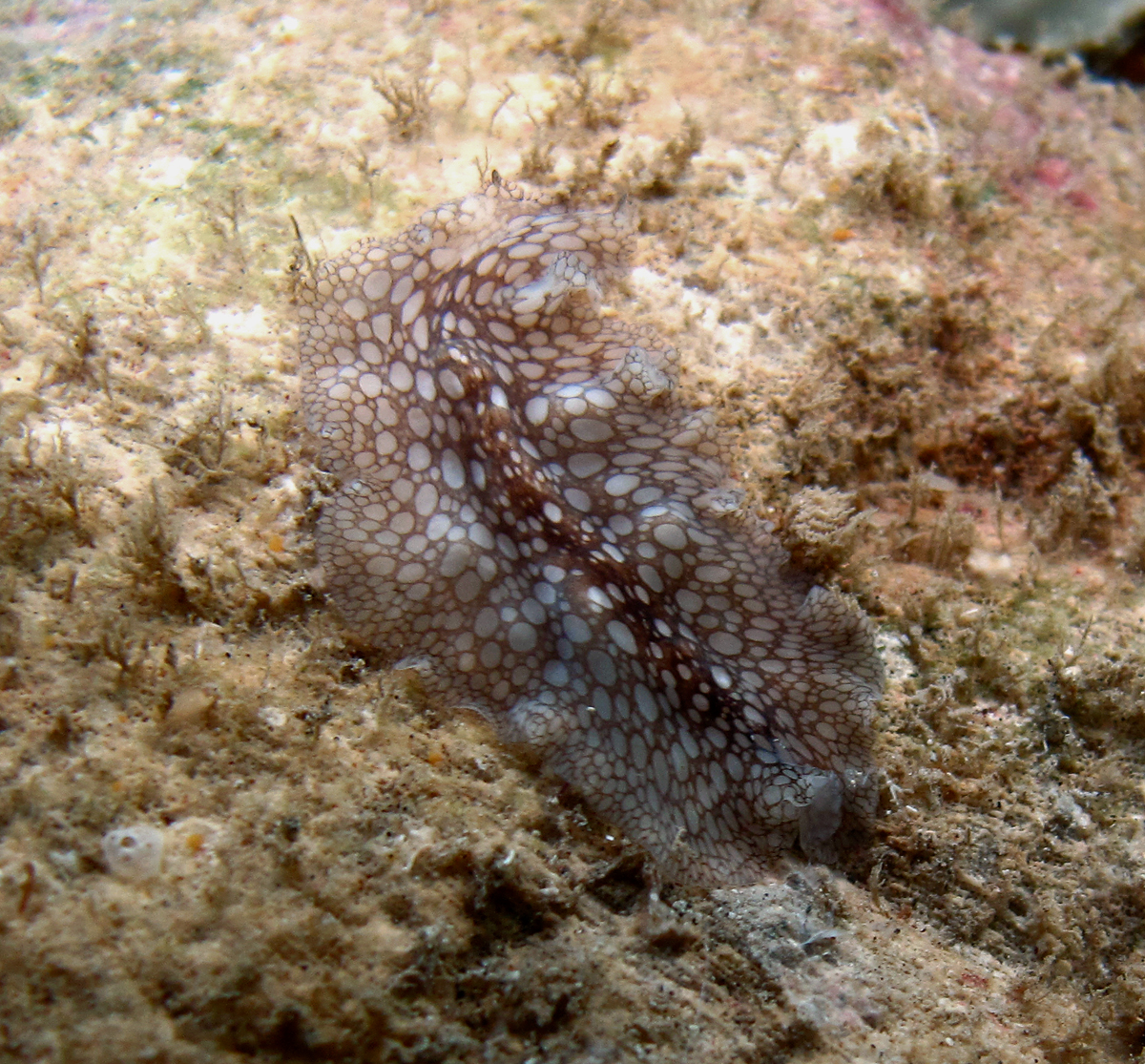
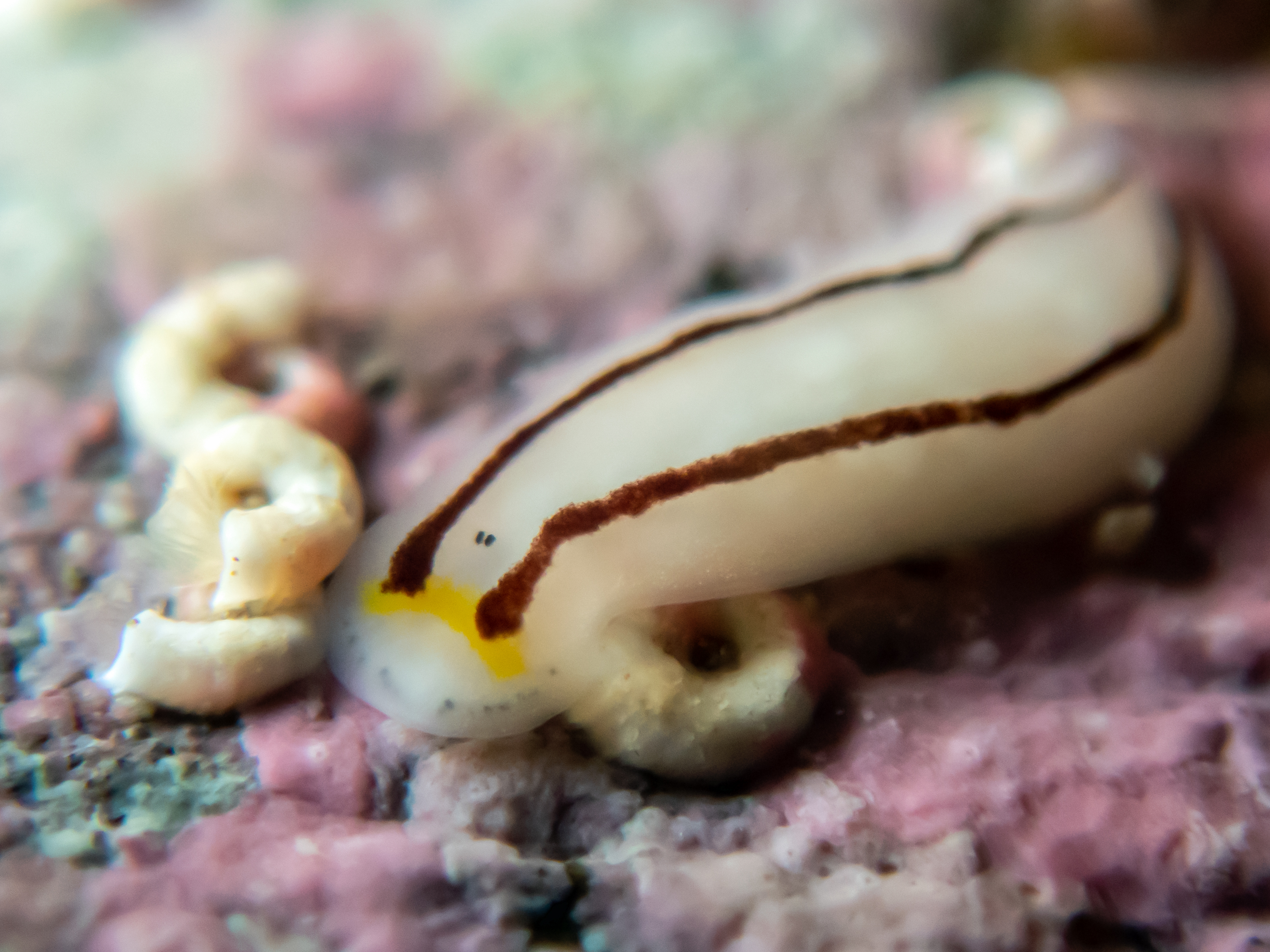
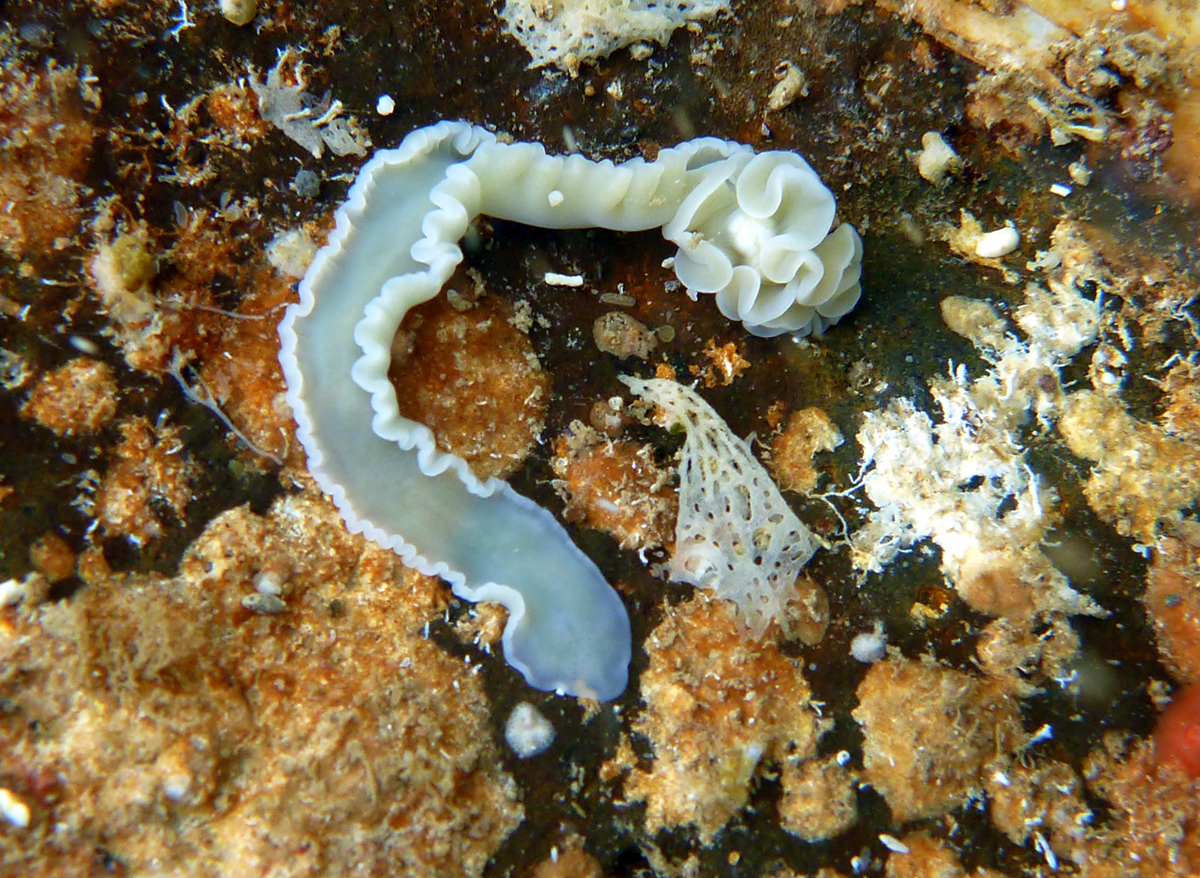
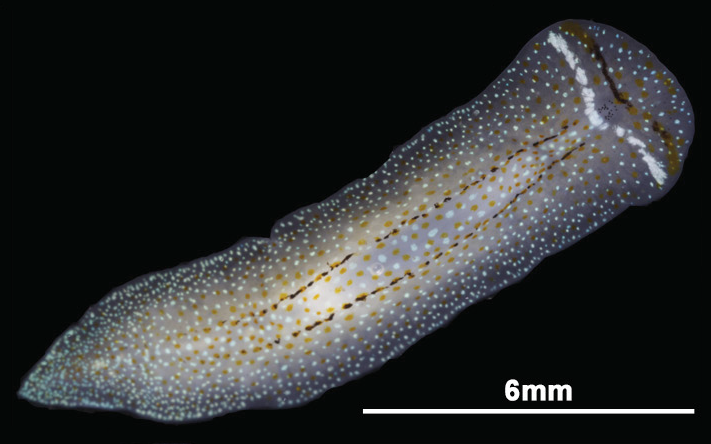
- From the left to right of each row, from top to bottom: Pseudobiceros gloriosus (Pseudocerotidae), Eurylepta sp. (Euryleptidae), Pericelis sp. (Periceloidea), Chromoplana sirena (Anonymoidea), Cestoplana sp. (Cestoplanidae), and Lurymare clavocapitata (Prosthiostomidae)

Scientific classification
- Kingdom: Animalia
- Phylum: Platyhelminthes
- Order: Polycladida
- Suborder: Cotylea; Lang, 1884

Families
- See text

= Cotylea (worm) =

Cotylea Temporal range: Triassic–Present, ~250–0 Ma Based on a molecular clock analysis

Suborder of flatworms

Cotylea is a suborder of free-living marine turbellarian flatworms in the order Polycladida.

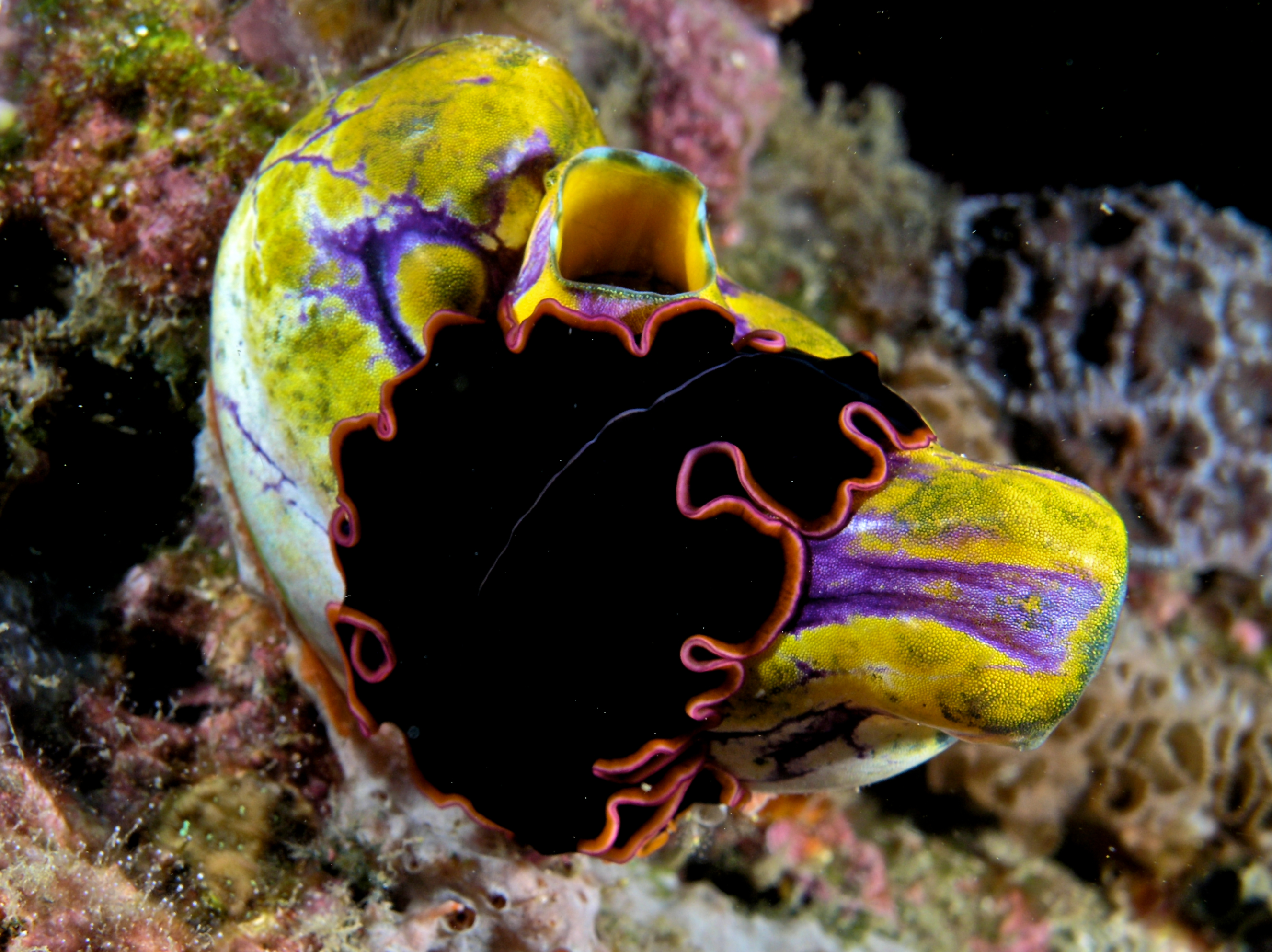
Pseudobiceros gloriosus (flatworm) on Polycarpa aurata (seasquirt)

== Taxonomy ==
The following clades are recognized as being included in the suborder Cotylea:

- Superfamily Anonymoidea Dittmann, Cuadrado, Aguado, Noreña & Egger, 2019
  - Family Anonymidae Lang, 1884
    - Genus Anonymus Lang, 1884
    - Genus Marcusia Hyman, 1953
    - Genus Simpliciplana Kaburaki, 1923
  - Family Chromoplanidae Bock, 1922
    - Genus Chromoplana Bock, 1922
- Superfamily Boninioidea Dittmann, Cuadrado, Aguado, Noreña & Egger, 2019
  - Family Amyellidae Faubel, 1984
    - Genus Amyella Bock, 1922
    - Genus Chromyella Correa, 1958
  - Family Boniniidae Bock, 1923
    - Genus Boninia Bock, 1923
    - Genus Paraboninia Prudhoe, 1944
    - Genus Traunfelsia Laidlaw, 1906
  - Family Theamatidae Marcus, 1949
    - Genus Theama Marcus, 1949
- Superfamily Ditremagenioidea Faubel, 1984
  - Family Ditremageniidae Palombi, 1928
    - Genus Ditremagenia Palombi, 1928
- Superfamily Opisthogenioidea Faubel, 1984
  - Family Opisthogeniidae Palombi, 1928
    - Genus Opisthogenia Palombi, 1928
- Superfamily Periceloidea Bahia, Padula & Schrödl, 2017
  - Family Pericelidae Laidlaw, 1902
    - Genus Pericelis Laidlaw, 1902
- Superfamily Pseudocerotoidea Faubel, 1984
  - Family Euryleptididae Faubel, 1984
    - Genus Euryleptides Palombi, 1923
  - Family Laidlawiidae Herzig, 1905
    - Genus Laidlawia Herzig, 1905
  - Family Stylochoididae Bock, 1913
    - Genus Stylochoides Hallez, 1907
  - Family Stylostomidae Dittmann, Cuadrado, Aguado, Noreña & Egger, 2019
    - Genus Euryleptodes Heath & McGregor, 1912
    - Genus Stylostomum Lang, 1884
- Family Cestoplanidae Lang, 1884
  - Genus Acestoplana Faubel, 1983
  - Genus Cestoplana Lang, 1884
  - Genus Cestoplanella Faubel, 1983
  - Genus Cestoplanides Faubel, 1983
  - Genus Cestoplanoida Faubel, 1983
  - Genus Eucestoplana Faubel, 1983
- Family Dicteroidae Faubel, 1984
  - Genus Dicteros Jacubowa, 1906
- Family Diposthidae Woodworth, 1898
  - Genus Asthenoceros Laidlaw, 1903
  - Genus Diposthus Woodworth, 1898
- Family Euryleptidae Stimpson, 1857
  - Genus Acerotisa Strand, 1928
  - Genus Anciliplana Heath & McGregor, 1912
  - Genus Ascidiophilla Newman, 2002
  - Genus Cycloporus Lang, 1884
  - Genus Eurylepta Ehrenberg, 1831
  - Genus Katheurylepta Faubel, 1984
  - Genus Leptoteredra Hallez, 1913
  - Genus Maritigrella Newman & Cannon, 2000
  - Genus Oligoclado Pearse, 1938
  - Genus Oligocladus Lang, 1884
  - Genus Parastylostomum Faubel, 1984
  - Genus Pareurylepta Faubel, 1984
  - Genus Praestheceraeus Faubel, 1984
  - Genus Prostheceraeus Schmarda, 1859
  - Genus Stygolepta Faubel, 1984
- Family Prosthiostomidae Lang, 1884
  - Genus Enchiridium Bock, 1913
  - Genus Enterogonimus Hallez, 1913
  - Genus Euprosthiostomum Bock, 1925
  - Genus Lurymare Er. Marcus & Ev. Marcus, 1968
  - Genus Prosthiostomum Quatrefages, 1845
- Family Pseudocerotidae Lang, 1884
  - Genus Acanthozoon Collingwood, 1876
  - Genus Bulaceros Newman & Cannon, 1996
  - Genus Monobiceros Faubel, 1984
  - Genus Nymphozoon Hyman, 1959
  - Genus Phrikoceros Newman & Cannon, 1996
  - Genus Pseudobiceros Faubel, 1984
  - Genus Pseudoceros Lang, 1884
  - Genus Thysanozoon Grube, 1840
  - Genus Tytthosoceros Newman & Cannon, 1996
  - Genus Yungia Lang, 1884
