= Hylocelis diabloensis =

Scientific classification
- Kingdom: Animalia
- Phylum: Platyhelminthes
- Order: Polycladida
- Suborder: Acotylea
- Family: Cryptocelidae
- Genus: Hylocelis
- Species: H. diabloensis

Binomial name
- Hylocelis diabloensis Bulnes, Faubel & Ponce de Leon, 2003

Species of flatworm

Hylocelis diabloensis is a species of flatworm belonging to the family Cryptocelidae.

== Description ==
H. diabloensis is elliptical in shape, with an undulating margin. It can reach around 13 mm in length. The color ranges from grey to pinkish, with a mid-dorsal longitudinal stripe that is reddish-brown.

== Etymology ==
The species is named after Punta del Diablo, where the type specimens were collected.

== Distribution ==
The species is known to be found on shoreline rocks in Uruguay, around Santa Teresa National Park.
