= Paraprostatum =

Scientific classification
- Kingdom: Animalia
- Phylum: Platyhelminthes
- Order: Polycladida
- Suborder: Acotylea
- Family: Euplanidae
- Genus: Paraprostatum; Faubel & Sluys, 2007
- Species: P. echinolittorinae

Binomial name
- Paraprostatum echinolittorinae Faubel & Sluys, 2007

Species of flatworm

Paraprostatum is a species of marine flatworm belonging to the family Euplanidae. It is monotypic, containing the sole species Paraprostatum echinolittorinae It is found within Mexico and Central America.

== Description ==
The genus Paraprostatum is distinguished from other Euplanids by a pharynx anterior to the mid-body or centrally oriented, the presence of eye spots, a potential lacking of nuchal tentacles or tentacular knobs, the presence of a stylet in the male copulatory apparatus that is joined to the proximal seminal vesicle, and the lack of a Lang's vesicle.

P. echinolittorinae is about 5 by 3 centimeters in size. The body is oval and elongate in shape, with blunt, rounded tips. The ends are not ruffled. The body is opaque, thick, and fleshy.

== Etymology ==
The genus name of Paraprostatum is derived from the Greek παρά (close to) and Aprostatum, referring to the taxonomic closeness of Paraprostatum to the other genus. The specific epithet of echinolittorinae is in reference to Echinolittorina modesta, which the species shares a commensal relationship with.

== Distribution and ecology ==
The species has been observed in the mantle cavities of several gastropods, having been found in several areas in Mexico and Central America. It has been found on coasts along this region such as Puerto Ángel and Playa de los Muertos in Mexico, Tárcoles, Manuel Antonio National Park and Guanacaste in Costa Rica, and the La Chocolatera cliff of Salinas in Ecuador.

P. echinolittorinae has been observed to practice commensalism with several gastropod species, occupying their mantle cavities. Among these species are several members of the genus Echinolittorina, Lottia mesoleuca, and Tegula pellisserpentis.
