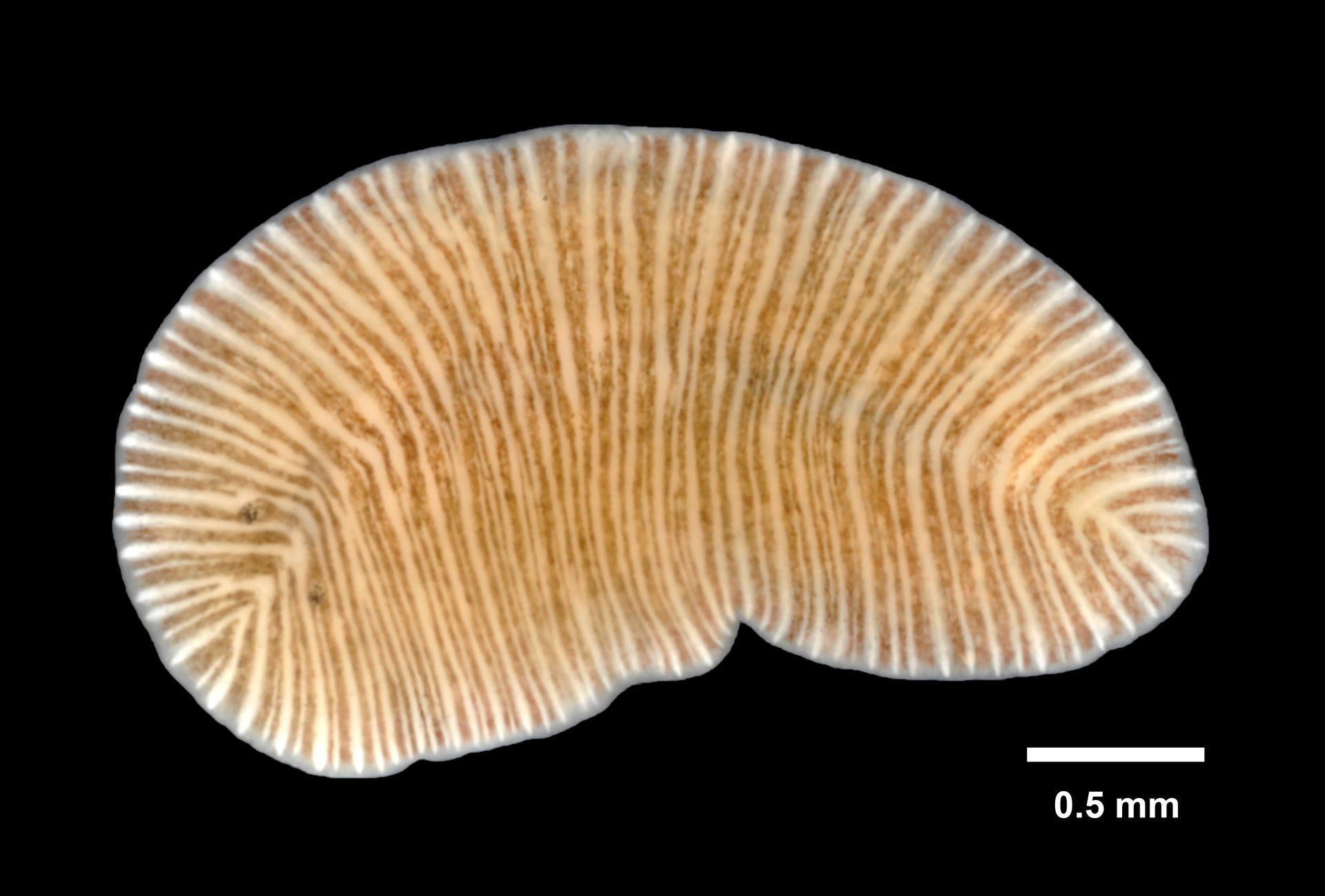

Scientific classification
- Kingdom: Animalia
- Phylum: Platyhelminthes
- Order: Polycladida
- Suborder: Acotylea
- Family: Stylochidae
- Genus: Stylochus
- Species: S. zebra

Binomial name
- Stylochus zebra (Verrill, 1882)

= Stylochus zebra =

Species of polyclad flatworm

Stylochus zebra is a species of polyclad flatworm in the family Stylochidae known for often living in shells with hermit crabs.

== Description ==
Stylochus zebra has an oblong or oblong-elliptical form that is rounded on both ends. The flatworm can reach up to about 40 mm long and 12 mm wide. The pseudotentacles on the head are short and round. The most distinguishable feature of S. zebra is the alternating brown and white banding pattern similar to the striped mammal zebra, hence the name. At both ends of the body, the stripes come to a V-shape.

== Distribution and habitat ==
Stylochus zebra is found from Cape Cod, Massachusetts to Florida along the western coast of the Atlantic Ocean and in the Gulf of Mexico. Within the flatworm's range, they are often found living in the shell of hermit crabs. However, they may be found free-living around rocky substrates and dock pilings, or alone in empty shells.

== Ecology ==
Stylochus zebra is often found living in gastropod shells alongside hermit crabs. The flatworm does have preferences for what hermit crabs it decides to live with. Within its northern range, S. zebra seems to prefer living with Pagurus pollicaris, while it is more often found living with Pagurus longicarpus in its southern range. Some of the other species of hermit crabs it has been known to live with include Pagurus impressus and Petrochirus diogenes. In the wild, the relationship between the flatworm and the hermit crab seems to be commensalistic.
