= Hylocelis =

Scientific classification
- Kingdom: Animalia
- Phylum: Platyhelminthes
- Order: Polycladida
- Suborder: Acotylea
- Family: Cryptocelidae
- Genus: Hylocelis; Faubel, 1983

Genus of flatworm

Hylocelis is a genus of flatworm belonging to the family Cryptocelidae.

== Description ==
Hylocelis is distinguished from other members of Cryptocelidae by the presence of tentacles, and tentacular and cerebral eye clusters. The male copulatory apparatus has a seminal vesicle and a penis stylet. The stylet is connected to the prostatic vesicle via a coiling ejaculatory duct. The female apparatus has a vagina bulbosa and a Lang's vesicle.

== Species ==
The following species are recognized in Hylocelis:

- Hylocelis californica (Heath & McGregor, 1912)
- Hylocelis diabloensis Bulnes, Faubel & Ponce de Leon, 2003
- Hylocelis huina (Marcus, 1954)
