= Kataria gloriosa =

Scientific classification
- Kingdom: Animalia
- Phylum: Platyhelminthes
- Order: Polycladida
- Suborder: Acotylea
- Family: Stylochidae
- Genus: Kataria; Faubel, 1983
- Species: K. gloriosa

Binomial name
- Kataria gloriosa (Kato, 1938)

Species of flatworm

Kataria gloriosa is a flatworm in the family Stylochidae. It is the only species in the genus Kataria.
