= Cryptocelis lilianae =

Scientific classification
- Kingdom: Animalia
- Phylum: Platyhelminthes
- Order: Polycladida
- Suborder: Acotylea
- Family: Cryptocelidae
- Genus: Cryptocelis
- Species: C. lilianae

Binomial name
- Cryptocelis lilianae Er. Marcus & Ev. Marcus, 1968

Species of flatworm

Cryptocelis lilianae is a species of flatworm belonging to the family Cryptocelidae. It is found within Brazil.

== Description ==
C. lilianae is described as colorless, and oval in shape. Adult specimens can reach around 7 millimetres (0.28 in) in length. It has a marginal band of eyes that completely encircles the body.

== Etymology ==
The species is mentioned as being named for its collector, Liliana Forneris.
