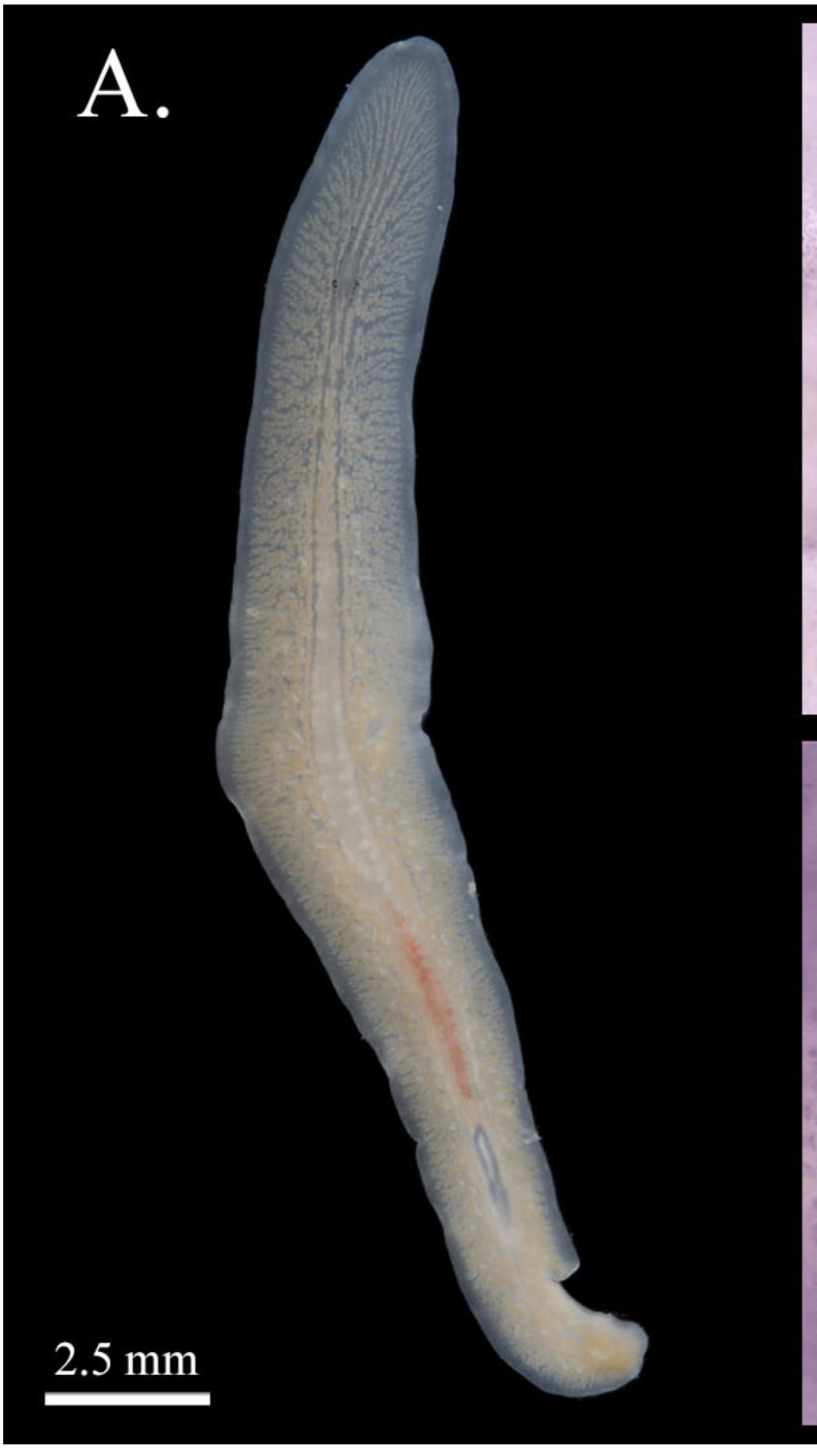

Scientific classification
- Kingdom: Animalia
- Phylum: Platyhelminthes
- Order: Polycladida
- Suborder: Acotylea
- Family: Faubelidae
- Genus: Amyris
- Species: A. hummelincki

Binomial name
- Amyris hummelincki Er. Marcus & Ev. Marcus, 1968

= Amyris hummelincki =

Species of flatworm

Amyris hummelincki is a species of flatworm belonging to the family Faubelidae. It is found in the Lesser Antilles.

== Description ==
Amyris hummelincki is around 7.5–10 mm in length and roughly 1.5 mm in width. It is colorless when preserved. The eyes form elongate clusters of up to 20 eyes each.

== Etymology ==
Amyris hummelincki was named in honor of its collector, Pieter Wagenaar Hummelinck, a Dutch zoologist and botanist.

== Distribution ==
Amyris hummelincki is known from specimens found in the Lesser Antilles, specifically on Curaçao and Bonaire (in Kralendijk).
