= Aprostatum clippertoni =

Scientific classification
- Kingdom: Animalia
- Phylum: Platyhelminthes
- Order: Polycladida
- Suborder: Acotylea
- Family: Euplanidae
- Genus: Aprostatum
- Species: A. clippertoni

Binomial name
- Aprostatum clippertoni (Hyman, 1939)

Synonyms
- Euplana clippertoni Hyman, 1939

Species of flatworm

Aprostatum clippertoni is a species of flatworm belonging to the family Euplanidae. It is found in the Northern Pacific Ocean.

== Description ==
A. clippertoni has been observed to reach up to 17 mm in length, and about 7 mm wide. Its eyes are loosely arranged and cerebral. The penis papilla is small with a pocket, a sheath, and a short stylet. The vagina is long and muscular with an S-bend. A small Lang's vesicle is present, and the genital pores are separated.

== Etymology ==
Though not explicitly stated in the original description, the specific epithet of clippertoni is almost certainly derived from Clipperton Island, where the type specimen was found.

== Distribution ==
A. clippertoni is known to be found in the Pacific Ocean around Clipperton Island.
