= Amyris bulbosa =

Scientific classification
- Kingdom: Animalia
- Phylum: Platyhelminthes
- Order: Polycladida
- Suborder: Acotylea
- Family: Faubelidae
- Genus: Amyris
- Species: A. bulbosa

Binomial name
- Amyris bulbosa Beveridge, 2018

Species of flatworm

Amyris bulbosa is a species of flatworm belonging to the family Faubelidae. It is found within Queensland.

== Description ==
Amyris bulbosa ranges from 11 to 19 mm in length and 3 to 7 mm in width. The backside of A. bulbosa is described as being a light fawn, speckled with darker brown; these speckles concentrate on each side of the body's midline and do not extend to the body's margin. Cerebral eyes number around 60, arranged in two groups. Some members of the species have larger tentacular eyes. The brain is bilobed; the pharynx is situated immediately posterior, and is plicate with around 12 ruffles on each side. The mouth is in the middle of the pharynx. The intestinal branches widely diverge.

The male gonopore is posterior to the pharynx, with a cirrus projecting through it. A sac with thin muscular walls encloses the prostatic vesicle and the cirrus' duct; muscle fibres run from the duct to the wall of the sac. The prostatic vesicle is ovoid and is projected into by the ejaculatory duct. The seminal vesicle is prominent and muscular, giving rise to the vasa deferentia. Being hermaphroditic, the female gonopore is behind the male, with the atrium giving rise to a spherical, thick-walled vagina bulbosa. The epithelium is composed of cells with basal nuclei and eosonophilic cytoplasm. The shell duct has a thick wall with cilia, and is surrounded by cement glands. The Lang's vesicle is diminutive.

== Taxonomy ==
Amyris bulbosa was formally described by Ian Beveridge in 2018. Morphology was used in distinguishing A. bulbosa from the other described members of Amyris; along with a distinguishing anterior pharynx, rather than posterior, and a greater amount of ruffles, the genitals of A. bulbosa differed markedly from those of the other known species.

=== Etymology ===
The specific name of bulbosa presumably derives from the species' prominent vagina bulbosa; bulbosa comes from the Latin word for "bulbous".

== Distribution ==
Amyris bulbosa type specimens come from Queensland, Australia; they reside in the intertidal, littoral zone, with the type specimens being found under rocks in Rowes Bay and Bowen.
