= Euplana carolinensis =

Scientific classification
- Kingdom: Animalia
- Phylum: Platyhelminthes
- Order: Polycladida
- Suborder: Acotylea
- Family: Euplanidae
- Genus: Euplana
- Species: E. carolinensis

Binomial name
- Euplana carolinensis Hyman, 1940

Species of flatworm

Euplana carolinensis is a species of flatworm belonging to the family Euplanidae. It is found within the United States in North Carolina.

== Description ==
E. carolinensis is elongate and obovate in shape, widest at the area of its brain and tapering to a blunt back point. It is about 5 mm in length. The color in its original description was described as "unknown" but "presumably brownish above". The differential diagnosis of E. carolinensis from other related species cites an elongated pharynx, separated cerebral and tentacular eye clusters, a long male atrium, a small penis papilla, an enlarged seminal vesicle, and a curved vagina as distinguishing the species.

== Etymology ==
Though not explicitly stated as such in the original description, the specific epithet of carolinensis is very likely taken from the species' type locality of North Carolina.

== Distribution ==
The species has been known to be found in the lagoon of Bogue Sound in the state of North Carolina. It has been found on shells and ascidians.
