= Cryptocelis sinopae =

Scientific classification
- Domain: Eukaryota
- Kingdom: Animalia
- Phylum: Platyhelminthes
- Order: Polycladida
- Family: Cryptocelidae
- Genus: Cryptocelis
- Species: C. sinopae

Binomial name
- Cryptocelis sinopae Gammoudi, Bulnes & Kurt 2021

Species of flatworm

Cryptocelis sinopae is a species of flatworm belonging to the family Cryptocelidae. It is found in the Black Sea near Turkey.

== Description ==
C. sinopae is described as oval in shape, around 15 mm in length. The front tip of the body is rounded, while the back is somewhat pointed, and it is laterally ruffled. The dorsum is yellowish to brownish in color with an unpigmented marginal band. Brown spots cover the dorsum, which concentrate in dorsal bands and round clusters.

== Etymology ==
The species is named for its type locality, the city of Sinop, Turkey, which in turn is thought to be named after the character of Sinope in Greek mythology.
