= Apidioplana apluda =

Scientific classification
- Kingdom: Animalia
- Phylum: Platyhelminthes
- Order: Polycladida
- Suborder: Acotylea
- Family: Apidioplanidae
- Genus: Apidioplana
- Species: A. apluda

Binomial name
- Apidioplana apluda Cannon, 1990

Species of flatworm

Apidioplana apluda is a species of flatworm in the family Apidioplanidae. It can be found on the Great Barrier Reef as a symbiote of gorgonian corals.

== Description ==
A. apluda is about 2 by 1 mm in size. The dorsum is a russet red color, while the ventral side is grey. There are four anterio-lateral eyes, in addition to two smaller median pairs. Distinctive of A. apluda is the presence of several 'apioid' organs on the ventral surface of the body; these organs each consist of a muscular capsule.

== Etymology ==
The specific epithet is derived from the Latin apluda, meaning "scale" or "chaff". It is in reference to the species being closely applied to their host.

== Distribution and ecology ==
A. apluda is known to be found on the Great Barrier Reef, acting as a symbiote of corals from the genus Melithaea.
