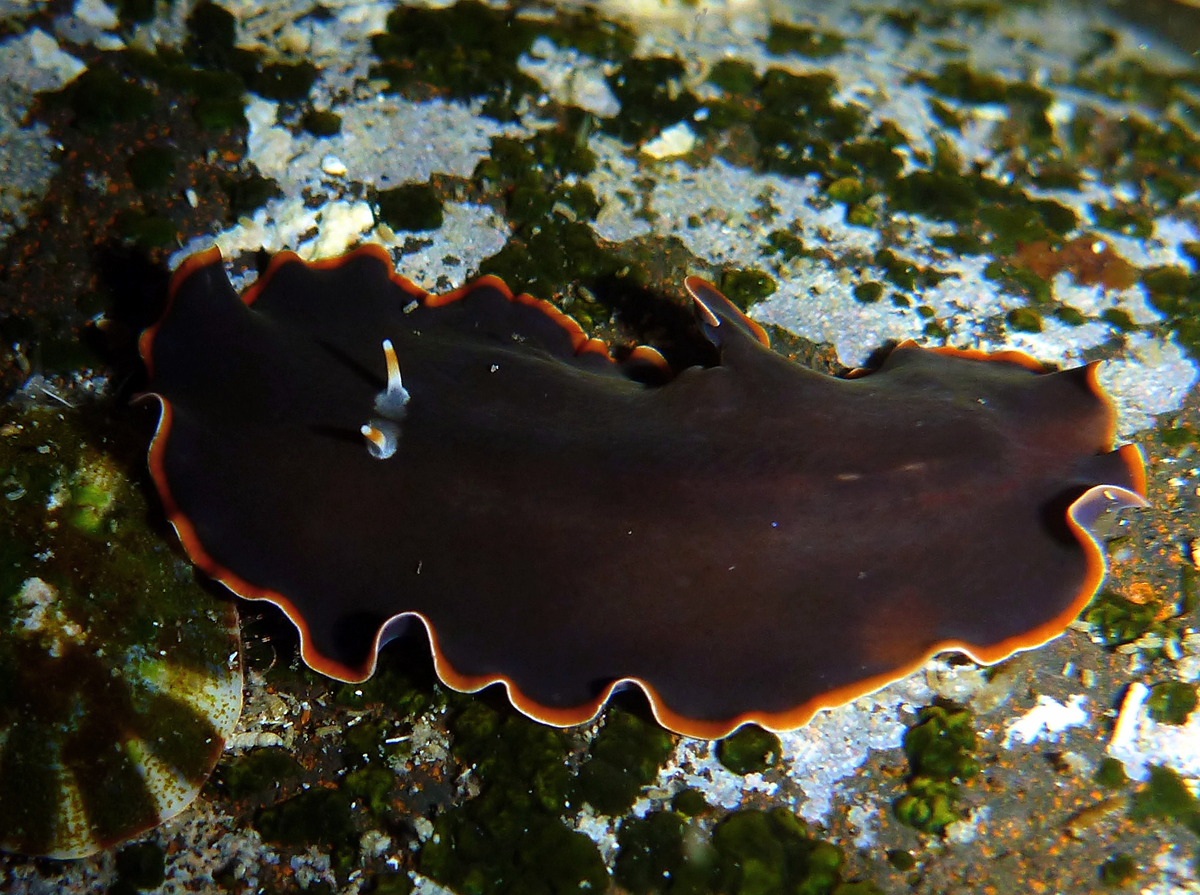
- Callioplana marginata

Scientific classification
- Kingdom: Animalia
- Phylum: Platyhelminthes
- Order: Polycladida
- Suborder: Acotylea
- Family: Callioplanidae
- Genus: Callioplana; Stimpson, 1857

Species
- Callioplana evelinae Marcus, 1954; Callioplana marginata Stimpson, 1857; Callioplana marianae Ramos-Sánchez, 2024

= Callioplana =

Genus of flatworms

Callioplana is a genus of flatworm polyclads belonging to the Callioplanidae family.
