= Cryptocelis =

Scientific classification
- Kingdom: Animalia
- Phylum: Platyhelminthes
- Order: Polycladida
- Suborder: Acotylea
- Family: Cryptocelidae
- Genus: Cryptocelis; Lang, 1884

Genus of flatworm

Cryptocelis is a genus of flatworm belonging to the family Cryptocelidae.

== Species ==
The following species are currently recognized in Cryptocelis:

- Cryptocelis alba (Schmidtlein, 1880)
- Cryptocelis amakusaensis Kato, 1936
- Cryptocelis compacta Lang, 1884
- Cryptocelis glandulata Jacubowa, 1909
- Cryptocelis ijimae Bock, 1923
- Cryptocelis insularis Hyman, 1953
- Cryptocelis lilianae Er. Marcus & Ev. Marcus, 1968
- Cryptocelis littoralis Kato, 1937
- Cryptocelis occidentalis Hyman, 1953
- Cryptocelis orientalis Kato, 1939
- Cryptocelis sinopae Gammoudi, Bulnes & Kurt, 2021
