= Didangia =

Scientific classification
- Kingdom: Animalia
- Phylum: Platyhelminthes
- Order: Polycladida
- Suborder: Acotylea
- Family: Didangiidae; Faubel, 1983
- Genus: Didangia; Faubel, 1983

Genus of flatworms

Didangia is a genus of flatworms belonging to the order Polycladida. It is the only genus in the monotypic family Didangiidae.

== Species ==
There are two species recognised in the genus Didangia:

- Didangia carneyi Quiroga, Bolanos & Litvaitis, 2008
- Didangia mactanensis Faubel, 1983
