= Notoplana acticola =

Conservation status
- Least Concern (IUCN 3.1)

Scientific classification
- Kingdom: Animalia
- Phylum: Platyhelminthes
- Order: Polycladida
- Suborder: Acotylea
- Family: Notoplanidae
- Genus: Notoplana
- Species: N. acticola

Binomial name
- Notoplana acticola Linnaeus, 1758

Species of flatworm

Notoplana acticola is a species of flatworms that belongs to Turbellarians. The flatworm is one of the most primitive flatworm that has a brain. This species has the ability to consume prey without a brain present. There is no specific evidence on what the flatworms eat regularly, but some research shows that they may eat limpets. Notoplana acticola are able to ingest food at a rapid rate. Research shows a normal flatworm can ingest one brine shrimp in less than a minute and eat up to 5 shrimp. The amount of shrimp consumed by a decerebrated flatworm is different due to the lack of control.

Notoplana acticola are located on the Pacific Ocean in intertidal areas. They are usually found under rocks or mussel beds that are able to filter water in and out. They are very small in size, ranging from about one to two inches in length. The flatworm appears to be a tan color with a darker shade running along the underside of the body. The species is wide at the anterior end, narrow at the posterior end, and has a slim body structure. The flatworm also has approximately 60 ocelli lining the body that help navigate their environment and respond to light.

The neuronal system in Notoplana acticola is the most unique feature of the flatworm.

Notoplana acticola have what is considered a true brain. Their body structure is bilaterally symmetrical and it involves cephalization. They have such unique brains because of the cellular and subcellular regions that regulate the behavior of the flatworm. The species also has a nerve-net that regulates the locomotory waves the flatworm develops. The locomotory waves in the flatworm are propelled by smooth muscle and hydrostatic skeleton. Notoplana acticola are not able to regenerate brain tissue, but their rate of neuronal repair is rapid.

== Habitat ==
The Notoplana acticola species are commonly located on the undersides of cobble stones, boulders, and other mussel beds which are found in rocky intertidal areas. This intertidal area receives a systematic exchange of water. When they are collected for biological purposes, they are normally found in tidal pools. Notoplana acticola are commonly found in the Pacific Ocean off of the coast of North America, specifically California.

== Behavior ==
The Notoplana acticola species is one of the most primitive animals that possesses a brain. They are able to acknowledge and ingest prey with the absence of the brain. Other polyclads do not acquire this ability, they have a tubular pharynx while Notoplana acticola have a plicate pharynx. Species that present a tubular pharynx cannot feed unless the brain is present.

Notoplana acticola crawl along rocks in intertidal locations by using a muscular retrograde wave. The retrograde motion is used for forward and backward locomotion. The antero-posterior wave can be reversed, which changes the locomotion direction. Notoplana has the ability to reverse the direction symmetrically by rotating the direction of their locomotory waves.The Notoplana acticola species was involved in a study conducted by The University of California, in which scientists determined the propagation of locomotory waves in the flatworm. Small incisions were made in the species' central and peripheral nervous systems to observe the effects of locomotion of the pedal waves. Research shows that there is no evidence behind the reproduction process of Notoplana acticola. However, studies show that all planarians are hermaphrodites, meaning each individual produces both male and female gametes. When the reproduction process occurs, one flatworm will inseminate the other flatworm, forcing the individual to carry other's eggs. The reproduction process normally occurs in the summer season. Although flatworms are hermaphrodites, they can also switch between asexual and sexual reproduction. The process of asexual reproduction occurs through the fragmentation process, which results in regeneration of missing body margins.

== Morphology/appearance ==
An adult Notoplana acticola can range from one to two inches in length. The flatworms appear to be a tan or gray color with a darker shade through the center of the body. A Notoplana acticola's body is wide on the anterior end and normally narrows towards the end of the body. The clusters are scattered throughout the body of the flatworm, including down the center band. Notoplana acticola have approximately sixty to eighty ocelli that are clustered on the dorsal tentacles. The ocelli are formed in two longitudinal bands that run alongside the cerebral ganglion. Each ocelli contains thirty to fifty photoreceptors which contribute to the dendritic process of cell pigmentation projections.

== Body systems ==
Notoplana acticola's body wall is composed of sheets of smooth muscle that consists of longitudinal, transverse, and oblique layers that alternate throughout. Additionally, the muscle and connective tissue fibers rotate back and forth between the ventral and dorsal sides. The body also contains parenchymatous tissue that explains the free movement of the locomotory waves the species utilizes. The species' ventral and dorsal body walls can range from 35-40 microns in thickness. The body wall of Notoplana acticola is considered bilaterally symmetrical that assist in the formation of tissue. Muscle and connective tissue fibers line the inside of the body crossing over the ventral and dorsal networking sides.

The digestive system in Notoplana acticola possesses a pharynx that is located on the anterior margin. The pharynx is devoted to food intake, which begins the digestion process. After the food is passed through the pharynx, the food then enters the gastrovascular cavity where it is distributed to provide nutrients to the flatworm.

== Neuronal system ==
The brains of the free-living polyclad, Notoplana acticola, are considered true brains. The body of the flatworm is bilaterally symmetrical and it involves cephalization. Notoplana acticola brains are unique because of the cellular and subcellular neural components that regulate the behavior of the flatworm. Notoplana acticola's brain consists of multipolar, heteropolar, and bipolar neurons. In contributing studies, research presents that Notoplana acticola represents a stage in their evolutionary process that demonstrates that neuronal behavior occurs in the peripheral nervous system. Research shows that the primitive nervous system of Notoplana acticola have presented further knowledge about the cellular morphology of the neuronal system. In a specific study from the University of California, motoneurons and touch cells were analyzed and results showed that the flatworm contains monopolar cells.

Notoplana acticola are unable to regenerate brain tissue, but there neuronal repair rate is prompt. In a specific study regarding nerve repair and behavioral recovery, brains were transplanted into decerebrated Notoplana acticola. The anatomy pattern and function of the brain were observed in the species to determine if the transplanted brain could accommodate to the existing flatworm. There were many transplants performed to observe the brain function, and normal behavior was seen as soon as thirty-six hours after the original surgery. There were four behaviors observed during the study: muscular behavior, avoidance behavior, ditaxic locomotion, and feeding behavior. Some of the nerves that were pre-existing in the brain began forming with the peripheral nerves nearby. There were quick connections between the neuronal and anatomical cords following the brain transplant, presenting the ability to re-innervate neuronal cords.

The nervous system in Notoplana acticola consists of a sensory nerve-net that contribute to the initiation of locomotion in the flatworm. The species neural system consists of a variety of nerve fibers in the central nervous system that are located on the anterior portion of the brain. The ventral and dorsal networks are formed by the nerve fibers, which resemble the nerve-net where information can be conducted and passed around. Research demonstrates the use of the flatworms nerve-net in assistance of locomotion. The locomotory waves begin at the anterior margin of the body and end at the posterior portion of the body. The majority of the locomotory waves are connected to the peripheral nerve nets. The locomotory waves present in this species are cultivated by the sheets of smooth muscle in the hydrostatic skeleton.

== Feeding ==
The species was engaged in a study presented by The University of Chicago Press in which the Notoplana acticola was offered a brine shrimp. The brine shrimp was placed at the anterior margin of the Notoplana acticola, and the flatworm extended its body toward the shrimp. The portion of the body closest to the prey is the portion the flatworm utilizes to grip the prey and ingest into its midventral mouth. If the flatworm has been starved, it will lunge at the prey, grip onto it, and quickly ingest it. However, if the flatworm is fed daily, it attacks normally and ingests at a slower rate. The study demonstrates that Notoplana acticola can accept three to five brine shrimp and fully digest them in approximately five minutes, but will not feed again for close to an hour.

If the prey is offered to the flatworm on the posterior lateral portion of the body, the flatworm will lift the end of the margin and grip the food. After gripping the food, a homolateral turn is followed to bring the anterior portion of the body in association with the food. This way, the food can pass through the anterior margin to the mouth for the flatworm to digest the prey. Compared to a decerebrate flatworm versus the normal flatworm there are different feeding behaviors. The brine shrimp was given to the decerebrated Notoplana acticola on the posterior margin portion of the body where the flatworm held on to the prey, but did not grip it. The prey was held at the posterior end of the body and was slowly transported to the mouth. When the brine shrimp was offered at the anterior end of the body the prey was swallowed and conveyed posteriorly into the mouth. The decerebrated flatworms will continue to accept brine shrimp with no limit.

Along with brine shrimp, Notoplana acticola are known to feed on limpets, which include shelled mollusks, barnacles and worms. All flatworms are considered carnivores, which ingest prey that consists of small invertebrates.
