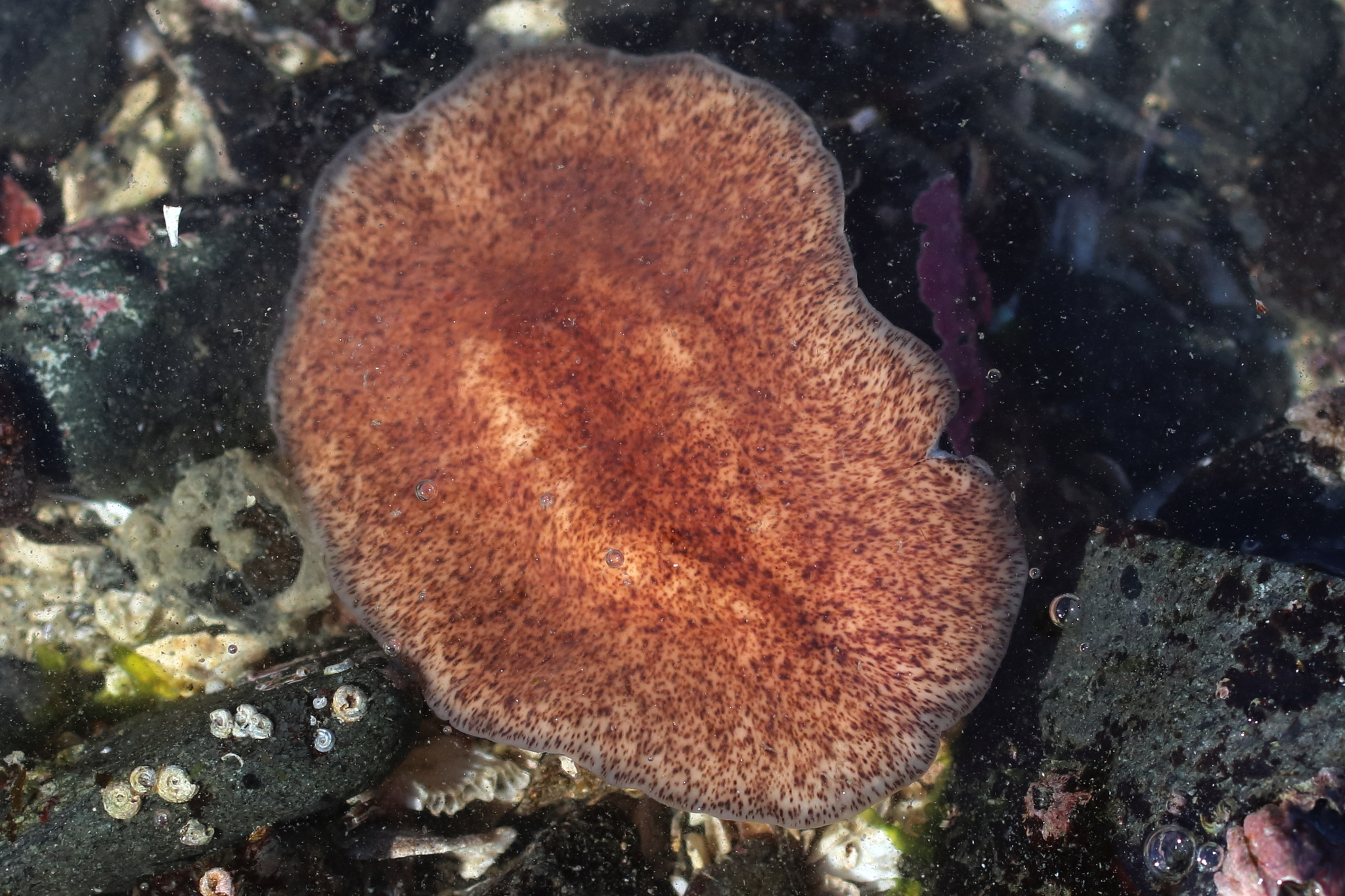
- Kenai Peninsula, 2020

Scientific classification
- Kingdom: Animalia
- Phylum: Platyhelminthes
- Order: Polycladida
- Suborder: Acotylea
- Family: Callioplanidae
- Genus: Kaburakia
- Species: K. excelsa

Binomial name
- Kaburakia excelsa Bock, 1925

Synonyms
- Cryptophallus magnus Freeman, 1933

= Kaburakia excelsa =

Species of flatworm

Kaburakia excelsa, the giant flatworm or giant leaf worm, is a species of flatworm found on the lower shore and shallow water in the eastern Pacific Ocean. It occurs on the lower shore and shallow sub-littoral zone.

== Description ==
Kaburakia excelsa can grow to a length of at least 9 cm (3.5 in). It is flat and nearly as broad as it is long. It has a pair of fleshy nuchal tentacles on the anterior end of the body near where the brain is located. These tentacles can be retracted. On them and near their base are a number of simple eyespots, and there are more of these above the brain and a row of them round the margin of the body. The marginal eyespots are difficult to see in living specimens but the gut can be discerned through the skin and has the branching form typical of this order of flatworms. The upper surface is tan with a few darker brown streaks and spots while the underside is paler and largely unspotted. This species has no suckers on the underside. It can be distinguished from other flatworms in the area by its much larger size, and is in fact one of the largest flatworms in the world, to over 9 cm long

== Distribution and habitat ==
This flatworm is native to the western seaboard of North America, its range extending from Sitka in Alaska to Baja California peninsula in Mexico. It is found on the lower shore and in the shallow sub-littoral zone, under rocks, on pilings, on the fouled hulls of boats and among mussels and rock-boring bivalves.

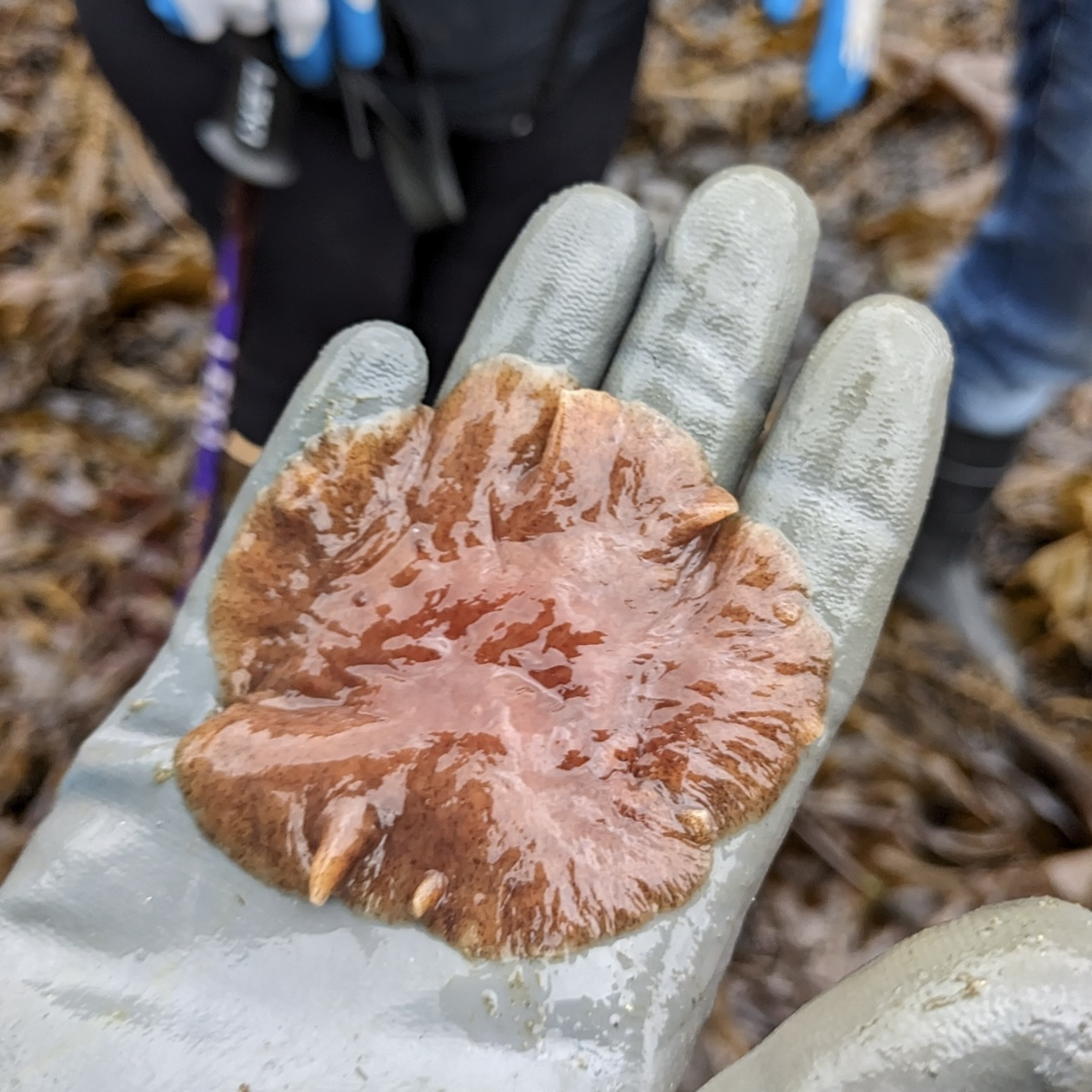
Kachemak Bay State Park, 2023

== Ecology ==
The diet of this flatworm is not known, but it will eat mussels in the laboratory. It moves away from light, and as it moves, wrinkles form along the margins. In Washington State, breeding takes place in March, and in the laboratory, this flatworm has bred between June and August and in December. The eggs are golden yellow and enclosed in capsules. About 150 are laid, and are packed closely in one or two layers, forming an egg plate that is stuck to a rock surface. They hatch in five or more weeks at 12 °C (54 °F) and the development of the offspring is direct. Newly hatched young are pale brown with five to seven eyespots. By a week later, they have darkened in colour, the front end becoming browner and the hind end becoming reddish.
