= Multisepta =

Scientific classification
- Kingdom: Animalia
- Phylum: Platyhelminthes
- Order: Polycladida
- Suborder: Acotylea
- Family: Cryptocelidae
- Genus: Multisepta; Cuadrado, Moro & Norena, 2017
- Species: M. fengari

Binomial name
- Multisepta fengari Cuadrado, Moro & Norena, 2017

Genus of flatworm

Multisepta is a genus of flatworm belonging to the family Cryptocelidae. It is monotypic, containing the sole species Multisepta fengari. It is found on El Hierro within the Canary Islands.

== Description ==
Members of Multisepta have tentacles, and both cerebral and tentacular eye clusters are present. The male copulatory apparatus has a true seminal vesicle and a complicated stylet. The prostatic vesicle is muscular. The gonopores are separated, and the vagina is bulbous.

M. fengari is oval in shape, around 6 mm in length. The dorsum is smooth, and there are two small nuchal tentacles. The body is translucent, and the margin has orange tones. The middle of the body is whitish. The ovaries give the species a mottled appearance.

== Etymology ==
The generic name Multisepta is derived from the Latin words multiplex and septum, meaning "multiple partitions", which refers to the unique structure of the species' prostatic vesicle. The specific epithet fengari is derived from the Greek φεγγάρι (fengári), meaning "moon", in reference to the species dorsally resembling translucent moonlight.

== Distribution and ecology ==
M. fengari is known to be found on the island of El Hierro within the Canary Islands. The holotype was found in a cove near the locality of La Restinga; the specimen was found in low light and in shallow waters.
