= Namyhplana =

Scientific classification
- Kingdom: Animalia
- Phylum: Platyhelminthes
- Order: Polycladida
- Suborder: Acotylea
- Family: Euplanidae
- Genus: Namyhplana; Brusa & Damborenea, 2013
- Species: N. henriettae

Binomial name
- Namyhplana henriettae Brusa & Damborenea, 2013

Genus of flatworm

Namyhplana is a genus of marine flatworm belonging to the family Euplanidae. It is monotypic, containing the sole species Namyhplana henriettae. It is found within Chile.

== Description ==
The genus Namyhplana is distinguished from other Euplanidae by the pharynx being anterior to the mid-body, the presence of cerebral, pre-cerebral and anterior marginal eye spots, a penis papilla, lacking any stylet, horizontally placed on the male copulatory apparatus, and a Lang's vesicle on the female apparatus.

N. henriettae has a ribbon-like body shape that can reach up to 25 mm in length. The dorsum is light brown, with two dark brown longitudinal bands. The ventral side of the body is beige. Additional distinguishing factors include an absence of tentacles, a pharynx with few folds, independent gonopores, and a curled vagina.

== Etymology ==
Both the generic and specific names of Namyhplana henriettae are given in honor of Libbie Hyman. The first part of Namyhplana, "Namyh", is an anagram of "Hyman", while henriettae is taken from Hyman's middle name, Henrietta.
