= Kaburakia =

Scientific classification
- Kingdom: Animalia
- Phylum: Platyhelminthes
- Order: Polycladida
- Suborder: Acotylea
- Family: Callioplanidae
- Genus: Kaburakia; Bock, 1925

Genus of flatworms

Kaburakia is a genus of flatworms belonging to the family Callioplanidae.

The species of this genus are found in Northern America.

Species:

- Kaburakia excelsa Bock, 1925
- Kaburakia oceanica (Hyman, 1955)
