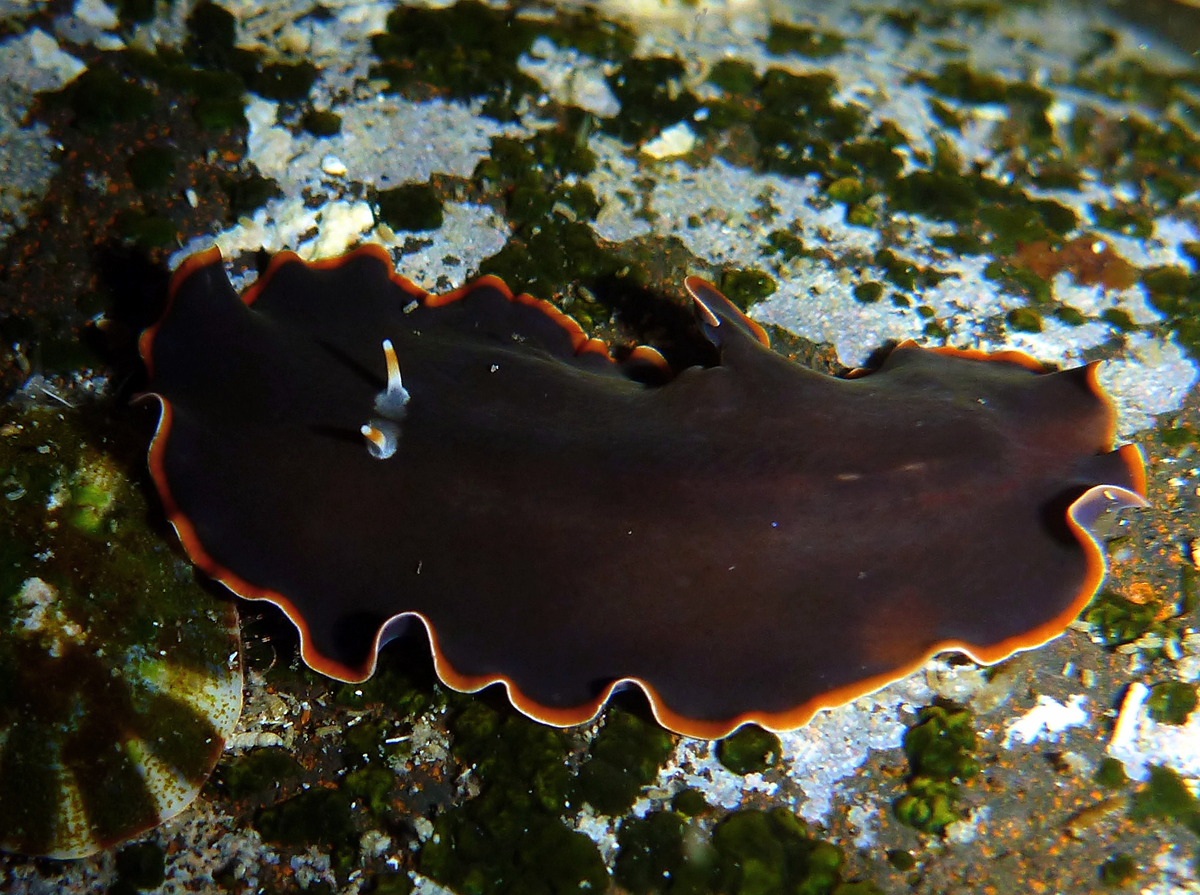

Scientific classification
- Kingdom: Animalia
- Phylum: Platyhelminthes
- Order: Polycladida
- Suborder: Acotylea
- Family: Callioplanidae
- Genus: Callioplana
- Species: C. marginata

Binomial name
- Callioplana marginata Stimpson, 1857

Synonyms
- Diplosolenia johnstoni Haswell, 1907; Planocera marginata (Stimpson, 1857); Planocera oxyceraea (Schmarda, 1859); Planocera oxycerea (Schmarda, 1859); Stylochus marginatus (Stimpson, 1857); Stylochus oxyceraeus Schmarda, 1859

= Callioplana marginata =

Species of flatworm

Callioplana marginata is a species of flatworm polyclads belonging to the Callioplanidae family.

Callioplana marginata is widespread throughout the tropical waters of the Indo/ West Pacific area.

This flatworm can reach a maximum size of 8 cm length .

Callioplana marginata has a dark background color going from black, brown to grey with a two marginal bands: a thin white band along the edge and a wider orange one. The main physical characteristic of this species is the pair of non-retractile head tentacles, their body is orange with a white basal line.
