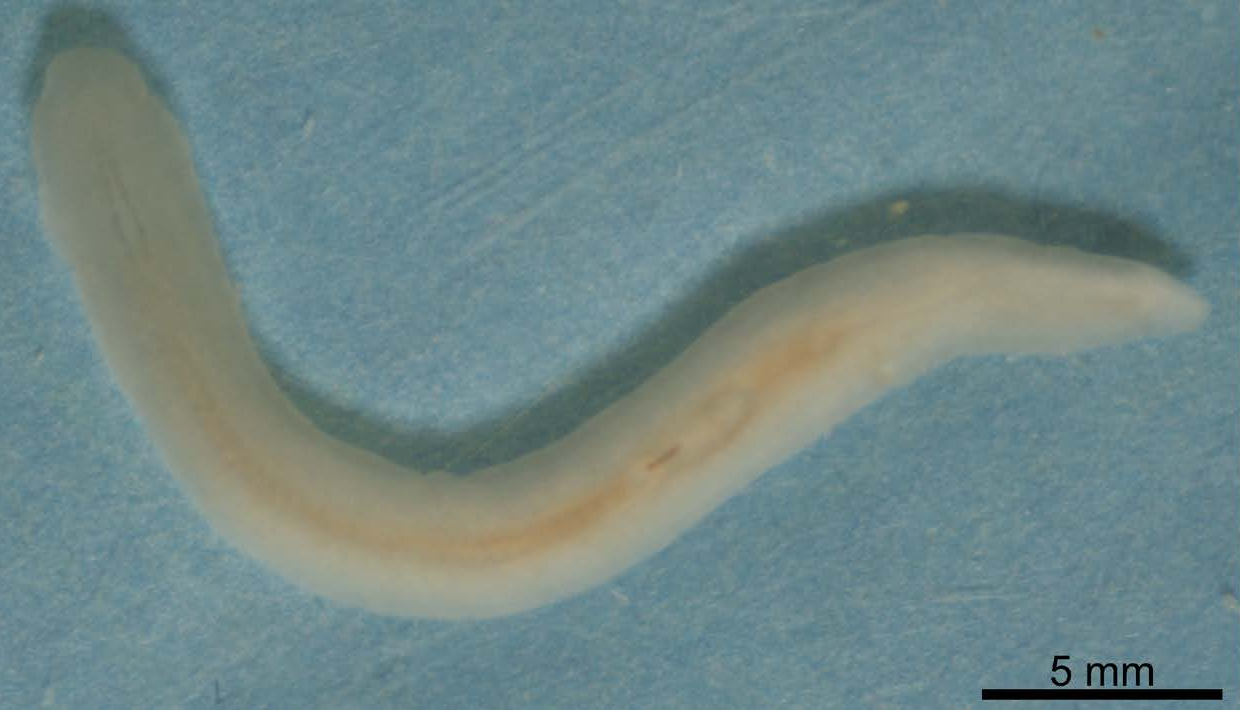
- Chimaeriplana japonica

Scientific classification
- Kingdom: Animalia
- Phylum: Platyhelminthes
- Order: Polycladida
- Suborder: Acotylea
- Superfamily: Leptoplanoidea
- Family: Candimboididae; Faubel, 1983

Type genus
- Candimboides Prudhoe, 1982

Genera
- Candimboides; Chimaeriplana

= Candimboididae =

Family of flatworms

Candimboididae is a family of flatworms belonging to the order Polycladida.

== Description ==
The family Candimboididae includes species of Leptoplanoidea with elongate body and without tentacles. The eyespots form two elongate clusters in the brain region. The pharynx lies in the middle third of the body and the male and female gonopores are well separated from the posterior end of the body. The male copulatory apparatus lies right behind the pharynx and has a muscular prostatic vesicle lined with a tall, smooth and glandular epithelium and a penis stylet in the penis pocket. The female copulatory apparatus has a bursa copulatrix.
