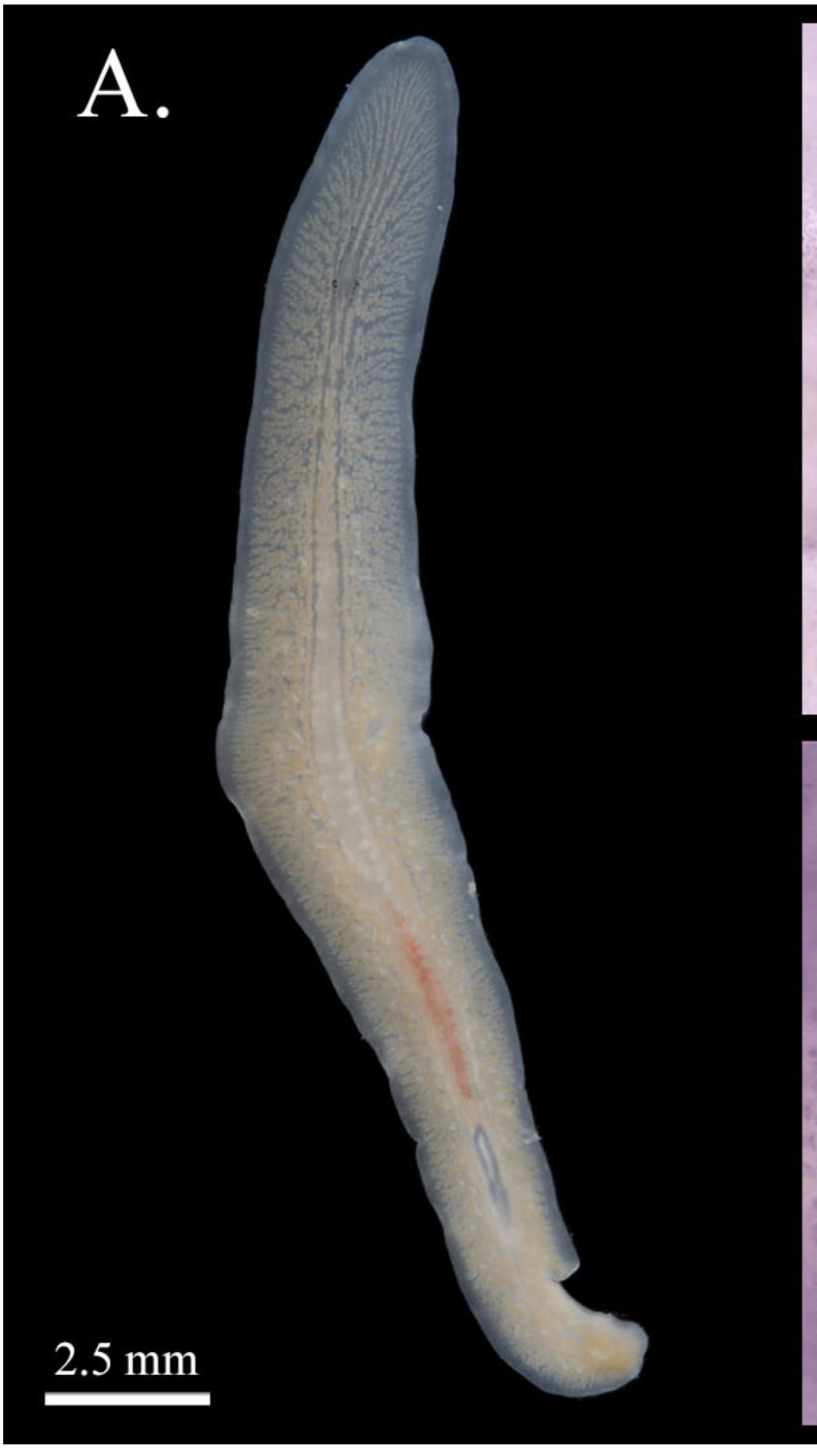
- Live specimen of Amyris hummelincki

Scientific classification
- Kingdom: Animalia
- Phylum: Platyhelminthes
- Order: Polycladida
- Suborder: Acotylea
- Family: Faubelidae
- Genus: Amyris; Er. Marcus & Ev. Marcus, 1968

= Amyris (flatworm) =

Genus of flatworm

Amyris is a genus of flatworm belonging to the family Faubelidae.

== Description ==
Members of Amyris are characterized by having a true seminal vesicle, an interpolated granule vesicle, a cuticularized cirrus, and a Lang's vesicle.

== Taxonomy ==
Currently, the following species are accepted in Amyris:

- Amyris bulbosa Beveridge, 2018
- Amyris favis Sopott-Ehlers & Schmidt, 1975
- Amyris hummelincki Er. Marcus & Ev. Marcus, 1968
