= Diplopharyngeata =

Scientific classification
- Kingdom: Animalia
- Phylum: Platyhelminthes
- Order: Polycladida
- Suborder: Acotylea
- Family: Euplanidae
- Genus: Diplopharyngeata; Plehn, 1896
- Species: D. filiformis

Binomial name
- Diplopharyngeata filiformis Plehn, 1896

Genus of flatworm

Diplopharyngeata is a monotypic genus of flatworm belonging to the family Euplanidae. It contains the sole species Diplopharyngeata filiformis.
