= Euplana claridade =

Scientific classification
- Domain: Eukaryota
- Kingdom: Animalia
- Phylum: Platyhelminthes
- Order: Polycladida
- Family: Euplanidae
- Genus: Euplana
- Species: E. claridade

Binomial name
- Euplana claridade Cuadrado, Rodriguez, Moro, Grande & Noreña, 2021

Species of flatworm

Euplana claridade is a species of flatworm belonging to the family Euplanidae. It is found within Cape Verde.

== Description ==
E. claridade is oval in shape, known to reach about 1 cm in length. The dorsal surface of the body is smooth. The dorsum is an ivory white color, of which the pigmentation is denser along the middle. E. claridade can be distinguished by other species in Euplana via having four clusters of eyes, two cerebral and two tentacular, as well as a long, tubular male atrium, a forward-directed vagina, a narrow and sinuous male copulatory organ, a long penis papilla, and a seminal vesicle that is practically non-existent.

== Etymology ==
The specific epithet of the species was given for the Cape Verdean magazine Claridade, for its "[revolutionization of] Cape Verdean culture during the first half of the twentieth century", as Cape Verde is the type locality of the species.

== Distribution ==
The species has been known to be found near waters surrounding São Vicente, in the city of Mindelo.
