= Pleioplanidae =

Scientific classification
- Kingdom: Animalia
- Phylum: Platyhelminthes
- Order: Polycladida
- Suborder: Acotylea
- Family: Pleioplanidae

Family of flatworms

Pleioplanidae is a family of flatworms belonging to the order Polycladida.

Genera:

- Izmira Bulnes, 2010
- Laqueusplana Rodríguez, Grande, Bulnes, Almon, Perez & Noreña, 2017
- Melloplana
- Persica
- Pleioplana Faubel, 1983
