= Candimboides =

Scientific classification
- Kingdom: Animalia
- Phylum: Platyhelminthes
- Order: Polycladida
- Suborder: Acotylea
- Family: Candimboididae
- Genus: Candimboides
- Species: C. cuneiformis

Binomial name
- Candimboides cuneiformis Prudhoe, 1982

Genus of flatworm

Candimboides is a genus of flatworm belonging to the family Candimboididae, in the order Acotylea. The genus is monotypic, containing the sole species Candimboides cuneiformis. It is found within Australia.

== Description ==
Candimboides species have elongate bodies without tentacles; the eyes are in two elongate clusters. The pharynx is close to the middle of the body, with the male copulatory organ posterior. The vasa deferentia form an opening into the seminal vesicle. The prostatic organ is muscular, lined with a smooth and tall epithelium. C. cuneiformis is known to be about 6.5 mm in length and 2.5 mm in width. The dorsum is a brownish color with dark speckled spots, representative of the ovaries.
