= Notocomplana lapunda =

Scientific classification
- Kingdom: Animalia
- Phylum: Platyhelminthes
- Order: Polycladida
- Suborder: Acotylea
- Family: Notocomplanidae
- Genus: Notocomplana
- Species: N. lapunda

Binomial name
- Notocomplana lapunda (Er. Marcus & Ev. Marcus, 1968)

Species of flatworm

Notocomplana lapunda is a flatworm. This worm is a hermaphrodite which lives in salt water. The scientific name of the species was first published by Er. Marcus & Ev. Marcus in 1968.
