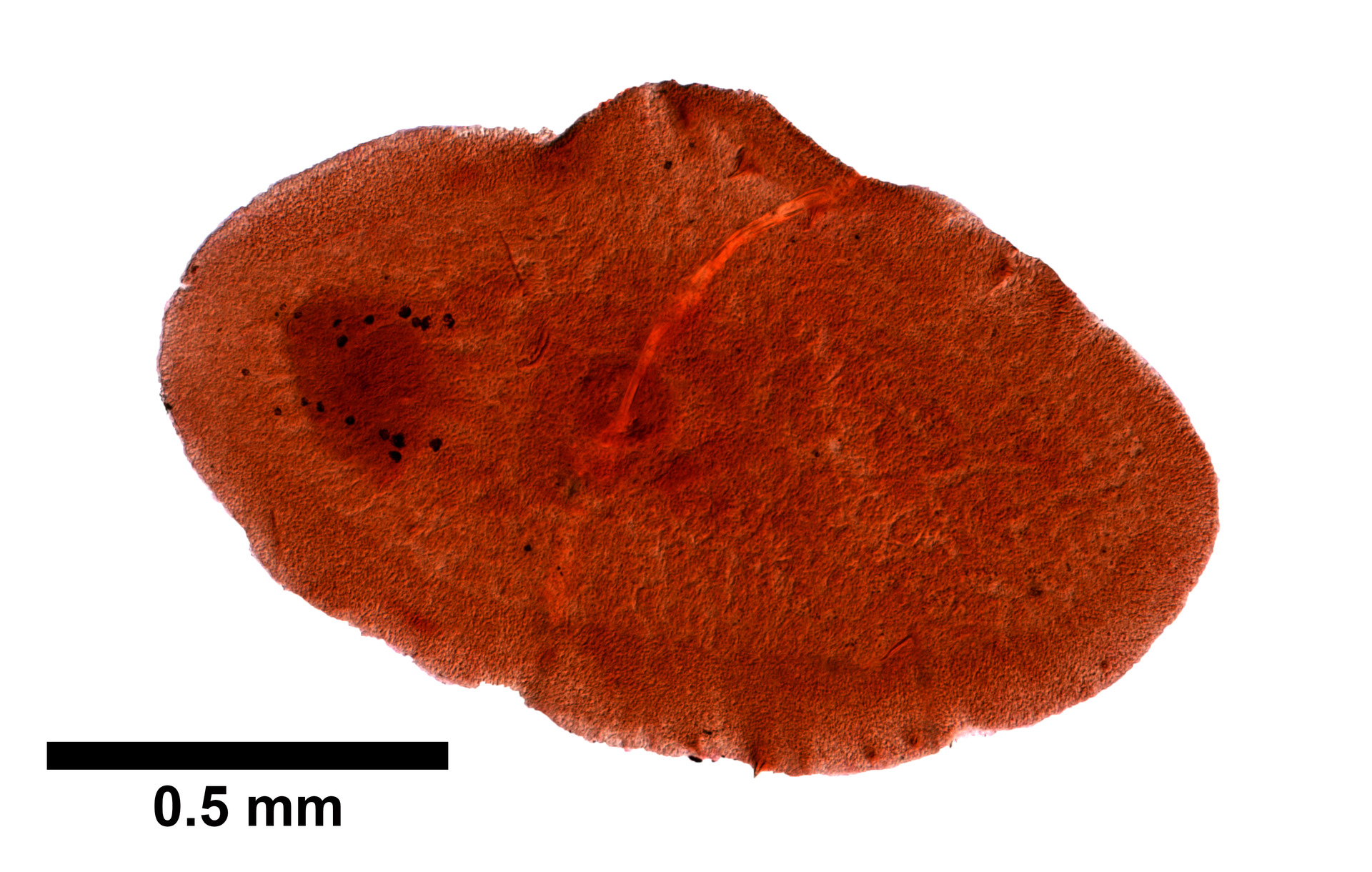
- Enantia spinifera

Scientific classification
- Kingdom: Animalia
- Phylum: Platyhelminthes
- Order: Polycladida
- Suborder: Acotylea
- Family: Enantiidae; Graff, 1889

Genera
- Enantia Graff, 1889; Spinantia Faubel, 1983

= Enantiidae =

Family of flatworms

Enantiidae is a family of flatworm belonging to the order Polycladida.

== Description ==
Members of Enantiidae have a smooth, ovoid body, with no presence of tentacles. The mouth is located at the anterior end behind the brain. The pharynx is bell-shaped. The male copulatory apparatus is simple, with a forward-directed seminal vesicle behind the pharyngeal sac.

== Taxonomy ==
Enantiidae currently holds two genera:

- Enantia Graff, 1889
- Spinantia Faubel, 1983
