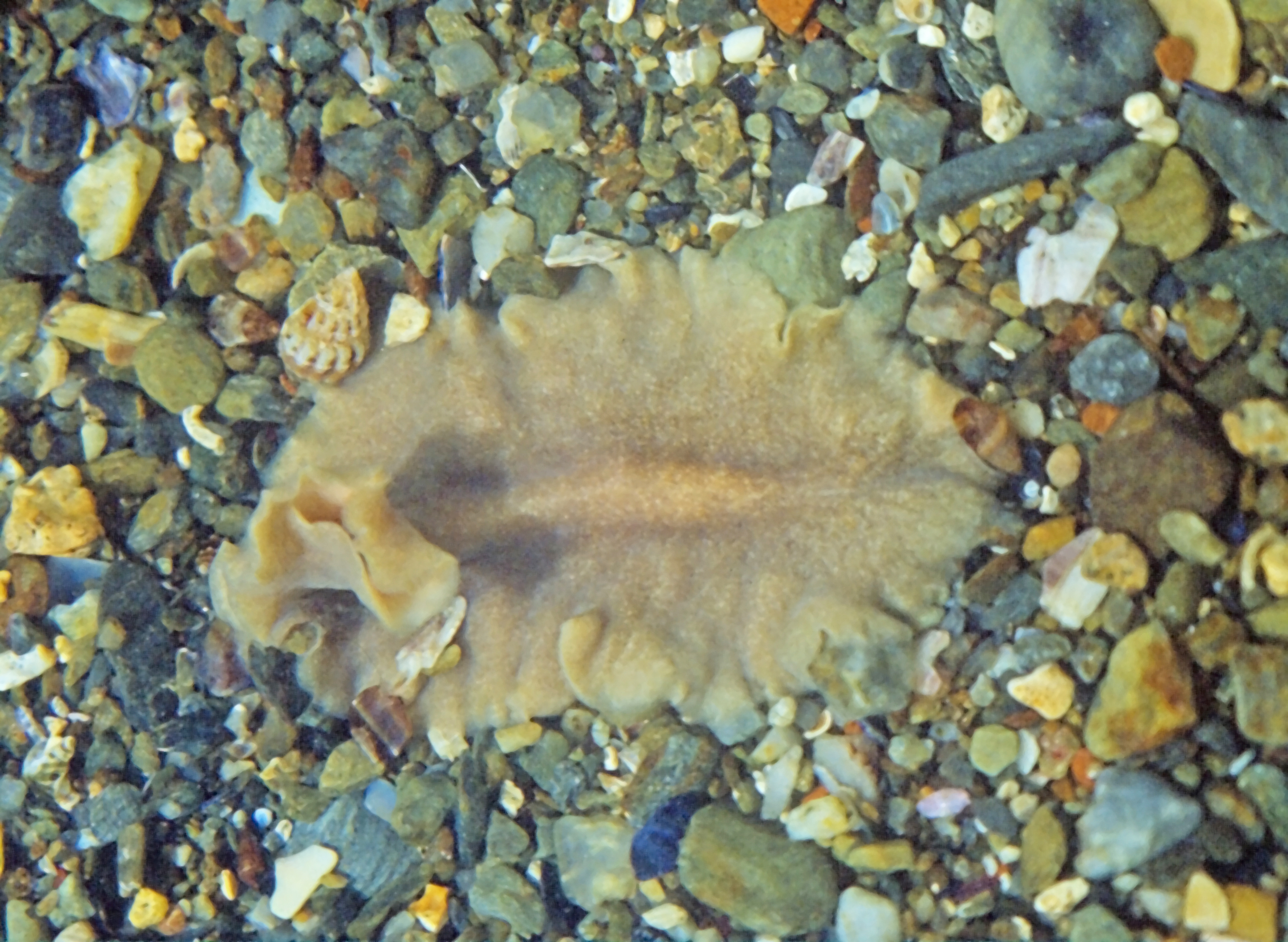
- Stylochus pilidium

Scientific classification
- Kingdom: Animalia
- Phylum: Platyhelminthes
- Order: Polycladida
- Suborder: Acotylea
- Family: Stylochidae

= Stylochidae =

Family of flatworms

Stylochidae is a family of polyclad flatworms. It includes the species Stylochus zebra, which usually lives in shells occupied by the hermit crab Pagurus pollicaris, though it can sometimes be found free living on rocks and pilings.

The family contains the following 6 genera containing 36 accepted species:

- Cryptostylochus
  - Cryptostylochus coseirensis
  - Cryptostylochus hullensis
  - Cryptostylochus koreensis
- Distylochus
  - Distylochus isifer
  - Distylochus martae
  - Distylochus pusillus
- Kataria
  - Kataria gloriosa
- Leptostylochus
  - Leptostylochus capensis
  - Leptostylochus elongatus
  - Leptostylochus gracilis
  - Leptostylochus novacambrensis
  - Leptostylochus pacificus
  - Leptostylochus palombii
  - Leptostylochus polysorus
- Stylochopsis
  - Stylochopsis ellipticus
  - Stylochopsis ponticus
- Stylochus
  - Stylochus alexandrinus
  - Stylochus argus
  - Stylochus bermudensis
  - Stylochus cinereus
  - Stylochus conglomeratus
  - Stylochus crassus
  - Stylochus ellipticus
  - Stylochus flevensis
  - Stylochus frontalis
  - Stylochus limosus
  - Stylochus luteus
  - Stylochus mediterraneus
  - Stylochus neapolitanus
  - Stylochus pillidum
  - Stylochus plessissii
  - Stylochus pygmaeus
  - Stylochus teuricus
  - Stylochus vesiculatus
  - Stylochus zanzibaricus
  - Stylochus zebra
