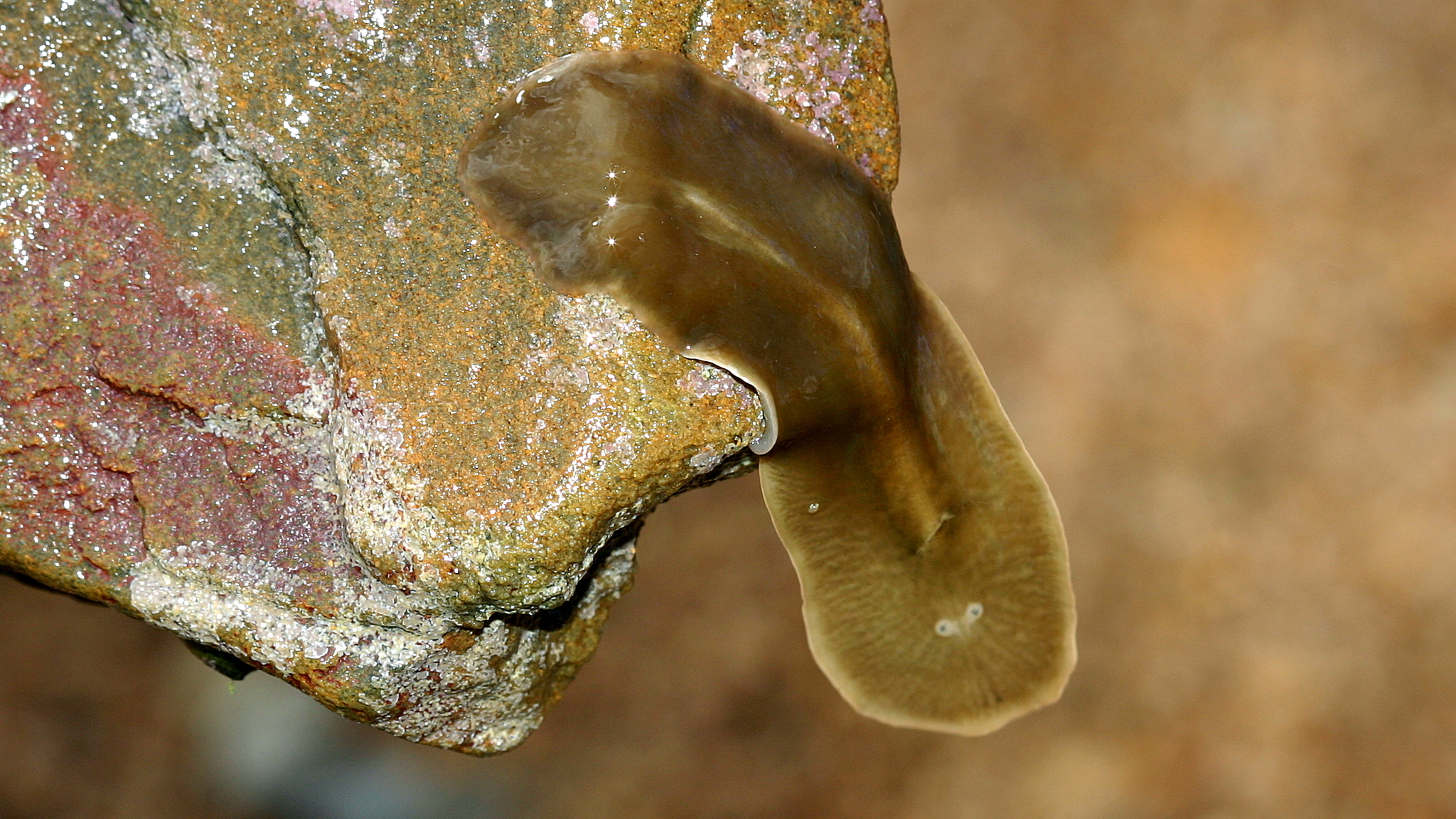
- Notoplana australis

Scientific classification
- Kingdom: Animalia
- Phylum: Platyhelminthes
- Order: Polycladida
- Suborder: Acotylea
- Family: Notoplanidae; Er. Marcus & Ev. Marcus, 1966

= Notoplanidae =

Family of flatworms

Notoplanidae is family of free-living marine turbellarian flatworms in the order Polycladida.

== Genera ==
The following genera and species are recognised in the family Notoplanidae:

- Anthoplana Bo & Betti, 2019
- Notoplana Laidlaw, 1903
  - Notoplana acticola, Linnaeus, 1758
  - Notoplana vitrea, Lang, 1884
- Plagiotata Plehn, 1896
