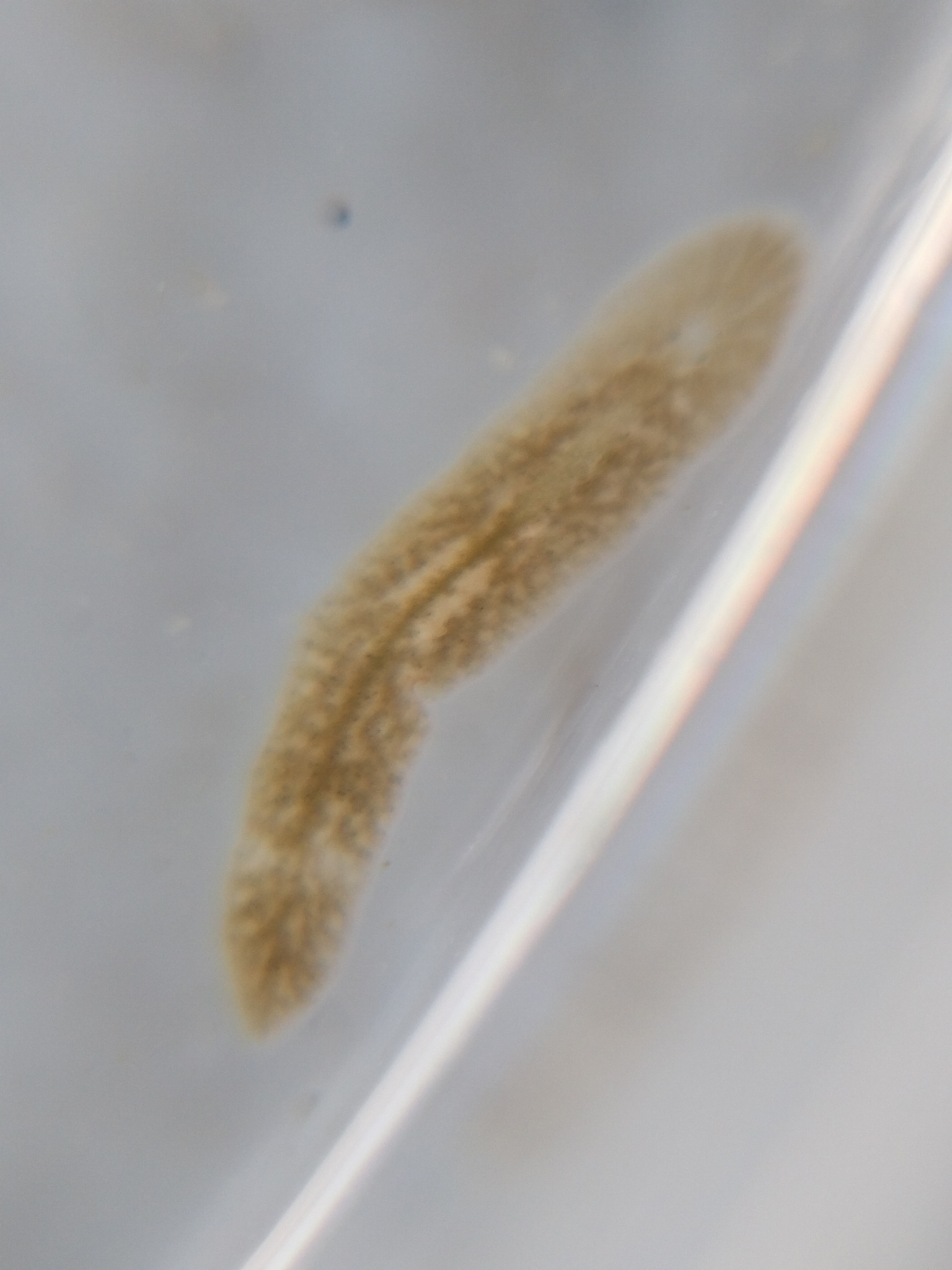
- Notocomplana acticola

Scientific classification
- Kingdom: Animalia
- Phylum: Platyhelminthes
- Order: Polycladida
- Suborder: Acotylea
- Family: Notocomplanidae; Litvaitis, Bolaños & Quiroga, 2019
- Genus: Notocomplana; Faubel, 1983

Species
- See text

Synonyms
- (Genus): Freemania Hyman, 1953; Melloplana Faubel, 1983; Pucelis Marcus, 1947

= Notocomplana =

Genus of flatworms

Notocomplana is a genus of flatworms. It is the only genus in the monotypic family Notocomplanidae.

== Species ==
- Notocomplana acticola (Boone, 1929)
- Notocomplana celeris (Freeman, 1933)
- Notocomplana chierchiae (Plehn, 1896)
- Notocomplana erythrotaenia (Schmarda, 1859)
- Notocomplana evelinae (Marcus, 1947)
- Notocomplana ferruginea (Schmarda, 1859)
- Notocomplana gardineri (Laidlaw, 1904)
- Notocomplana hagiyai Oya & Kajihara, 2017
- Notocomplana humilis (Stimpson, 1857)
- Notocomplana japonica (Kato, 1937)
- Notocomplana koreana (Kato, 1937)
- Notocomplana lapunda (Er. Marcus & Ev. Marcus, 1968)
- Notocomplana libera (Kato, 1939)
- Notocomplana litoricola (Heath & McGregor, 1912)
- Notocomplana longiducta (Hyman, 1959)
- Notocomplana longisaccata (Hyman, 1959)
- Notocomplana martae (Marcus, 1948)
- Notocomplana mexicana (Hyman, 1953)
- Notocomplana microsora (Schmarda, 1859)
- Notocomplana natans (Freeman, 1933)
- Notocomplana otophora (Schmarda, 1859)
- Notocomplana palaoensis (Kato, 1943)
- Notocomplana palta (Marcus, 1954)
- Notocomplana rupicola (Heath & McGregor, 1912)
- Notocomplana sanguinea (Freeman, 1933)
- Notocomplana sanjuania (Freeman, 1933)
- Notocomplana saxicola (Heath & McGregor, 1912)
- Notocomplana sciophila (Boone, 1929)
- Notocomplana septentrionalis (Kato, 1937)
- Notocomplana sophia (Kato, 1939)
- Notocomplana syntoma (Marcus, 1947)
- Notocomplana tavoyensis (Prudhoe, 1950)
- Notocomplana timida (Heath & McGregor, 1912)
