= Didangia carneyi =

Scientific classification
- Domain: Eukaryota
- Kingdom: Animalia
- Phylum: Platyhelminthes
- Order: Polycladida
- Family: Didangiidae
- Genus: Didangia
- Species: D. carneyi

Binomial name
- Didangia carneyi Quiroga, Bolanos & Litvaitis, 2008

Species of flatworm

Didangia carneyi is a species of aquatic flatworm belonging to the family Didangiidae. It is found in the Gulf of Mexico.

== Description ==
D. carneyi is ovoid in shape, around 1.4–2.2 mm in length. When preserved, the dorsum is a whitish color with brown to pink pigment, which is more concentrated in the pharynx region. It is possible that the species could be pink in life. Brown dots are present radially from the pharynx. The ventral surface is a cream-whitish color; the uteri are visible as two dark lines on each side of the pharynx.

D. carneyi is further distinguished by the orientation of its two accessory prostatic vesicles, which each bear a stylet; additionally, the stylets merge to form a copulatory organ. Additional distinguishing features are the male atrium being surrounded by large glandular cells, two rows of cerebral eyes, and the presence of tentacular eyes.

== Etymology ==
The specific epithet was given in honor of Dr. Robert Carney of Louisiana State University, as he was the chief scientist on the cruise that collected D. carneyi's type specimens.

== Distribution ==
The only known distribution currently of D. carneyi is in the Gulf of Mexico off the coast of the state of Louisiana. Specimens were found on a wild wood fall at around a 600-meter depth.
