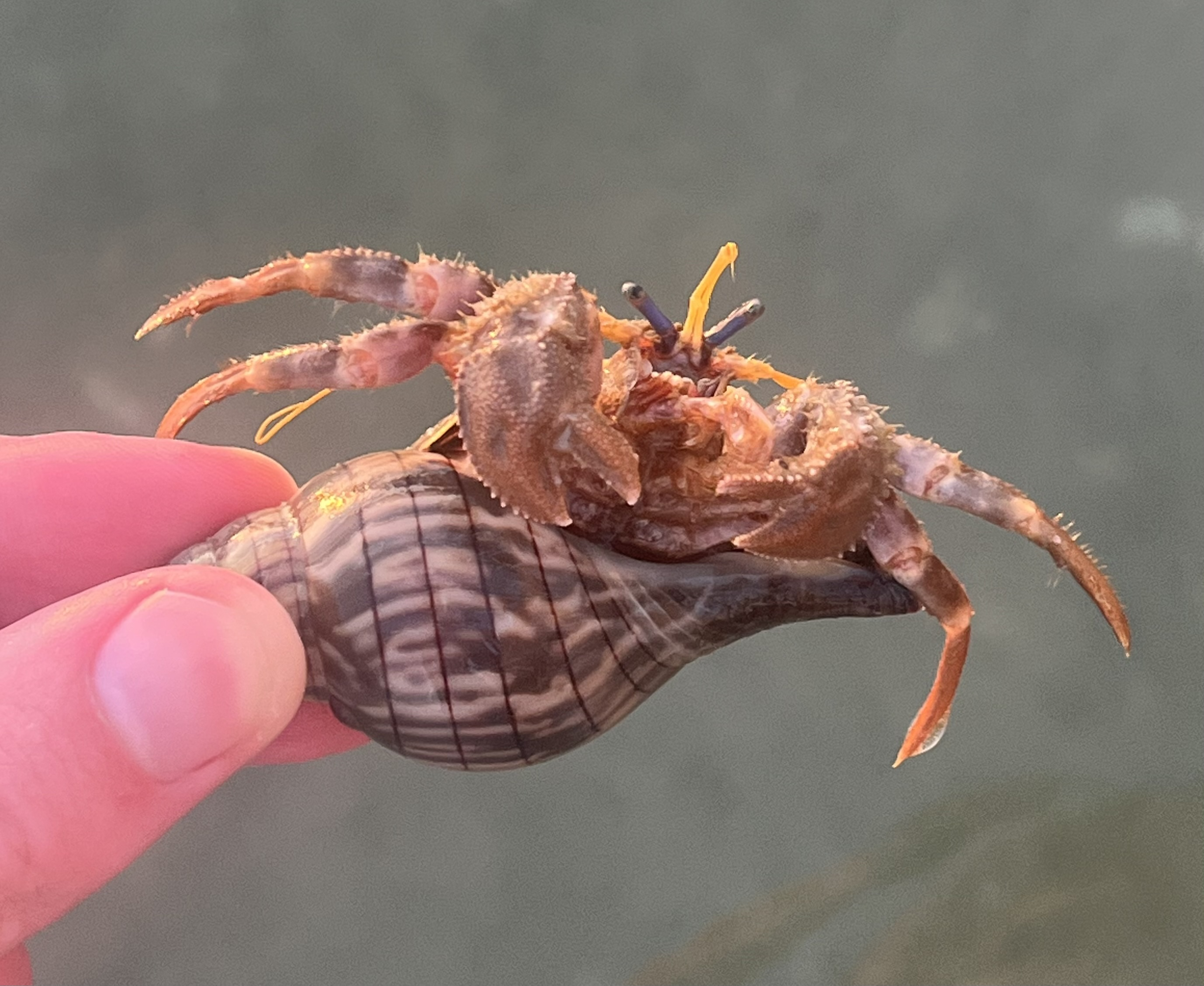
- Pagurus impressus in the shell of a Cinctura hunteria

Scientific classification
- Kingdom: Animalia
- Phylum: Arthropoda
- Clade: Pancrustacea
- Class: Malacostraca
- Order: Decapoda
- Suborder: Pleocyemata
- Infraorder: Anomura
- Family: Paguridae
- Genus: Pagurus
- Species: P. impressus

Binomial name
- Pagurus impressus Benedict, 1892

= Pagurus impressus =

Species of Atlantic hermit crab

Pagurus impressus, also known as the dimpled hermit crab or palmate hermit crab, is a species of hermit crab in the family Paguridae.

== Description ==
P. impressus is a relatively moderate sized hermit crab most easily identifiable by depressions on the dorsal side of the propodus of each cheliped. The chelipeds are also flattened, similar to P. pollicaris; however, P. pollicaris lacks the depressions. Much of P. impressus's body is reddish-brown, with some white spots across the thorax and at joints. The corneas are black with translucent yellow covers attached to dark brown eye stalks. The antennae are yellow.

== Distribution and habitat ==
The known range of P. impressus is from the shores of Diamond Shoals, North Carolina in the western Atlantic to Port Aransas, Texas in the Gulf of Mexico.

Within its known range, P. impressus is often found on sandy substrates. The hermit crab is known to inhabit seagrass beds and dock pilings in intertidal and subtidal depths.

== Ecology ==
While P. impressus is often found in the shells of large gastropods, it may also use sponges instead and is one of the best studied hermit crabs to do so. The process tends to start with the hermit crab using a shell covered in an epibiotic sponge. As the sponge outgrows the shell, the hermit crab continues to live in a tunnel formed within the sponges. Some of the sponges P. impressus is known to live with include Suberites domuncula and Pseudospongosorites suberitoides. When in a laboratory setting, the hermit crab is known to prefer gastropod shells over sponges, possibly due to sponge shells being more affected by wave energy. Shells containing P. impressus may also be shared with other epibiota including tricolor anemone, Calliactis tricolor, and snail fur, Hydractinia echinata.
