= Apidioplana okadai =

Scientific classification
- Domain: Eukaryota
- Kingdom: Animalia
- Phylum: Platyhelminthes
- Order: Polycladida
- Family: Apidioplanidae
- Genus: Apidioplana
- Species: A. okadai

Binomial name
- Apidioplana okadai Kato, 1944

Species of flatworm

Apidioplana okadai is a species of flatworm in the family Apidioplanidae. It has been found in Japan.

== Description ==
A. okadai has an elongate body with rounded ends, and is about 4–5 mm in length. It has an orange-red dorsum. The brain is located near the front seventh of the body, and rudimentary tentacles are situated nearby. A. okadai has a thick muscular wall that distinguishes it from some other species.

== Etymology ==
Though not explicitly stated as such in the original description, it is likely that the specific epithet was given in honor of Yaichirō Okada, who found the species' type specimen.

== Distribution and ecology ==
A. okadai is known to be found in Japan, off the coast of the city of Shimoda. It is known to be symbiotic with Melithaea japonica (then described as Melitodes flabellifera).
