= Notoplana vitrea =

Scientific classification
- Domain: Eukaryota
- Kingdom: Animalia
- Phylum: Platyhelminthes
- Order: Polycladida
- Family: Notoplanidae
- Genus: Notoplana
- Species: N. vitrea

Binomial name
- Notoplana vitrea (Lang, 1884)

Species of flatworm

Notoplana vitrea is a species of free-living marine flatworm in the family Notoplanidae. It is found in the Mediterranean Sea and the Black Sea.

== Description ==
Notoplana vitrea is a long slender flatworm, growing to a length of about 40 mm (1.6 in), being broadest at the front. The whitish body has a delicate, fragile appearance and is transparent, so that the pharynx and the convoluted gut can be seen through the cuticle, occupying most of the body space. There are no tentacles but there are a pair of stalked eyespots. The ventral surface is yellowish. Microscopic examination is necessary to distinguish it from several other similar translucent flatworms found in the Mediterranean.

== Distribution and habitat ==
Notoplana vitrea is endemic to shallow parts of the Mediterranean Sea and the Black Sea. It is a common flatworm and is to be found on the seabed, under stones and among calcareous algae. It can move relatively quickly, either by gliding across the seabed or by swimming.
