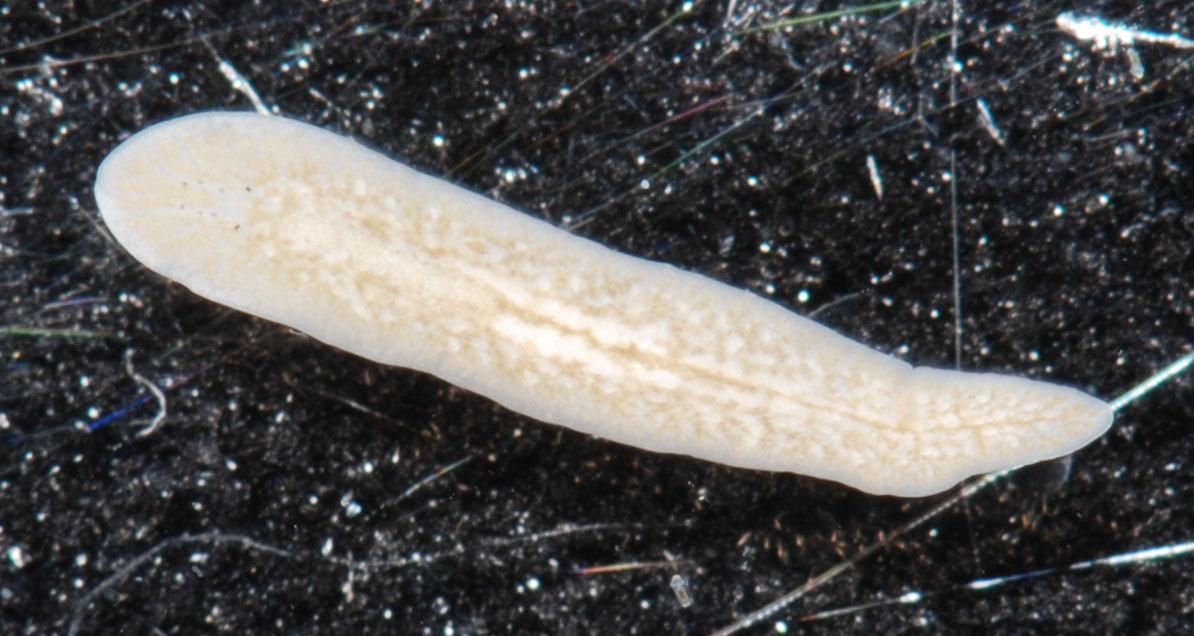
- Euplana gracilis

Scientific classification
- Domain: Eukaryota
- Kingdom: Animalia
- Phylum: Platyhelminthes
- Order: Polycladida
- Family: Euplanidae
- Genus: Euplana; Girard, 1893

Synonyms
- Conjuguterus Pearse, 1938

= Euplana =

Genus of flatworm

Euplana is a genus of flatworm belonging to the family Euplanidae.

== Description ==
Members of Euplana are defined by being somewhat elongated in shape. Members lack a prostatic vesicle, and the genital pores are close together. Tentacles are lacking, and unlike others in the family Euplanidae, the penis is not armed with any sort of stylet, being small or even absent. Species may or may not have a Lang's vesicle.

== Taxonomy ==
There are currently four species accepted in Euplana:

- Euplana carolinensis Hyman, 1940
- Euplana claridade Cuadrado, Rodriguez, Moro, Grande & Noreña, 2021
- Euplana gracilis Girard, 1853
- Euplana hymanae Marcus, 1947
