= Stylochocestidae =

Scientific classification
- Kingdom: Animalia
- Phylum: Platyhelminthes
- Order: Polycladida
- Suborder: Acotylea
- Family: Stylochocestidae; Bock, 1913

Genera
- Barcoplana Bulnes, Faubel & Ponce de Leon, 2003; Chatziplana Faubel, 1983; Mabelaplana Bulnes, Faubel & Ponce de Leon, 2003; Pentaplana Marcus, 1949; Stylochocestus Laidlaw, 1904

Family of flatworms

Stylochocestidae is a family of polyclad flatworms belonging to the suborder Acotylea.
