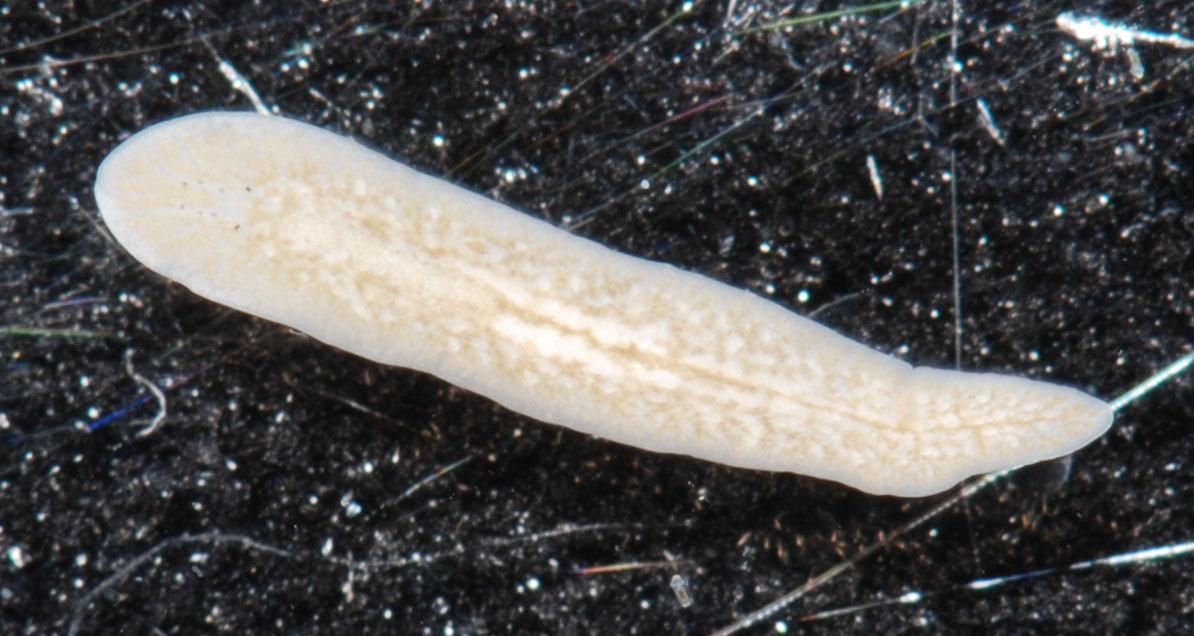

Scientific classification
- Domain: Eukaryota
- Kingdom: Animalia
- Phylum: Platyhelminthes
- Order: Polycladida
- Family: Euplanidae
- Genus: Euplana
- Species: E. gracilis

Binomial name
- Euplana gracilis Girard, 1853

Synonyms
- Conjuguterus parvus Pearse, 1938; Elasmodes gracilis (Girard, 1850); Leptoplana gracilis (Girard, 1850); Prosthiostomum gracile Girard, 1853

= Euplana gracilis =

Species of flatworm

Euplana gracilis is a species of marine flatworm belonging to the family Euplanidae. It is found within the United States.

== Description ==
E. gracilis is slender and elongate in shape, reaching up to 8 mm in length. The front end may be pointed or rounded, while the back end may be obtuse or rounded. The color of the species can range from yellowish gray to brownish gray. There are six eyes on each side, of which four are in a lengthwise row, and two obliquely placed together.

== Distribution and ecology ==
The species has been known to be found in the Chesapeake Bay, where it acts as a predator on certain species. Particularly, it has been found to prey on the amphipod Apocorophium lacustre.
