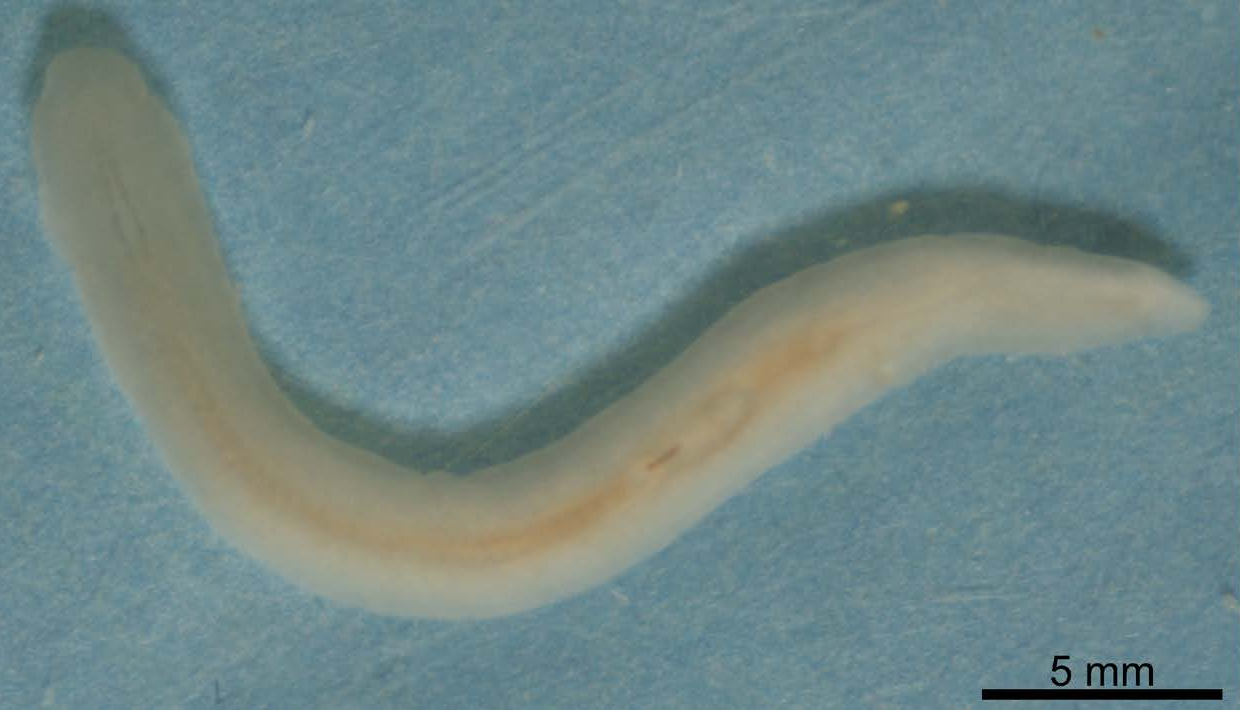

Scientific classification
- Kingdom: Animalia
- Phylum: Platyhelminthes
- Order: Polycladida
- Suborder: Acotylea
- Family: Candimboididae
- Genus: Chimaeriplana; Oya & Hagiya, 2023
- Species: C. japonica

Binomial name
- Chimaeriplana japonica Oya & Hagiya, 2023

= Chimaeriplana =

Genus of flatworm

Chimaeriplana is a genus of polyclad flatworm belonging to the family Candimboididae, in the order Acotylea. The genus is monotypic, containing the sole species Chimaeriplana japonica.

== Description ==
Chimaeriplana is characterized by the presence of numerous prostatoid organs in the male copulatory apparatus and a penis stylet with a split tip, as well as the lack of a Lang's vesicle in the female copulatory apparatus. The eyespots are arranged into two elongate clusters in the brain region, as typical of the family.

== Distribution ==
Currently C. japonica is only known from its type locality, Sagami Bay, in Japan.
