= Apidioplana =

Scientific classification
- Kingdom: Animalia
- Phylum: Platyhelminthes
- Order: Polycladida
- Suborder: Acotylea
- Family: Apidioplanidae
- Genus: Apidioplana; Bock, 1926

Genus of flatworm

Apidioplana is a genus of flatworm belonging to the monotypic family Apidioplanidae.

== Taxonomy ==
Currently, four species are accepted within Apidioplana:

- Apidioplana apluda Cannon, 1990
- Apidioplana mira Bock, 1926
- Apidioplana okadai Kato, 1944
- Apidioplana similis Bock, 1927
