= Anocellidus =

Anocellidus profundus

Scientific classification
- Kingdom: Animalia
- Phylum: Platyhelminthes
- Order: Polycladida
- Suborder: Acotylea
- Family: Anocellidae; Quiroga, Bolanos & Litvaitis, 2006
- Genus: Anocellidus; Quiroga, Bolanos & Litvaitis, 2006
- Species: A. profundus

Binomial name
- Anocellidus profundus Quiroga, Bolanos & Litvaitis, 2006

Genus of flatworms

Anocellidus is a genus of flatworms belonging to the order Polycladida. It is the only genus in the monotypic family Anocellidae and is represented by the single species Anocellidus profundus.

== Description ==
Anocellidus as a genus is distinguished from other acotylean flatworms by the lack of a true prostatic vesicle, and the fact that the male copulatory apparatus is located posterior to the male gonopore and is directed anteriorly; it is additionally distinguished via a ruffled pharynx located anteriorly with long, pointed tentacles, separate gonopores, a backwards-directed, long, pointed stylet, and the presence of spermiducal bulbs rather than a true seminal vesicle.

A. profundus is whitish in color; however, the testes and ovaries are visible across the epidermis as numerous brown dots. They can reach around 13 mm in length. There are well-developed nuchal tentacles. The species completely lacks eyes.

== Etymology ==
The generic name is derived from the Latin roots an- and ocell, literally meaning "without little eyes", in reference to the genus' lack of any eyes. The specific epithet is derived from the Latin profundus, "deep", in reference to the depth that the species is found, at depths of around 3000 meters below sea level.
