= Peter Ax =

German zoologist (1927–2013)

- Born: March 29, 1927; Hamburg, Germany
- Died: May 2, 2013 (aged 86)
- Spouse: Renate Ax

Academic background
- Education: University of Kiel

Academic work
- Discipline: zoology
- Institutions: University of Göttingen
- Doctoral students: Anno Faubel
- Main interests: interstitial fauna phylogenetics
- Notable works: Mikrofauna marina

Peter Ax (March 29, 1927 – May 2, 2013) was a German zoologist whose main work concerned the investigation of interstitial fauna and the exposition of a phylogenetic system for the animals.

== Biography ==
Peter Ax attended the Oberschule für Jungen in Hamburg until 1944 and subsequently completed his military service. He studied biology at the University of Kiel from 1946, and graduated with a doctorate in 1950. From 1952 to 1961, he was employed as a scientific worker at the same university. He gained his habilitation in 1955, and worked as a Dozent. In 1961, he went to the University of Göttingen, where he held the chair in Morphology and Systematic Zoology. He remained there until his retirement as an emeritus professor in 1992.

== Research ==
Peter Ax worked primarily on the micro- and meiofauna of the interstitial environment in marine sediments, and on the systematics of flatworms. He described an array of hitherto unknown species from this environment, including Diplosoma micans, the first tunicate to be found in the interstitial habitat, in 1970. In 1956 he was the first to describe the Gnathostomulida, which was also found from this habitat. Through his works such as Das phylogenetische System (1984) and the three-volume Das System der Metazoa (1995-2001), he also became known as one of the important exponents of phylogenetic systematics in Germany.

== Memberships and awards ==
Peter Ax was the founding editor of the journal Mikrofauna marina. He worked as a guest scientist at the Friday Harbor Laboratories of the University of Washington, at the marine biological stations in Arcachon, Banyuls-sur-Mer, and Naples, and at the Darwin Station on the Galapagos Islands.

He was a member of the Akademie der Wissenschaften und der Literatur in Mainz, a fellow at the Institute for Advanced Study, Berlin in 1986/87, and an honorary member of the Gesellschaft für Biologische Systematik.

== Selected works available in English ==
- The phylogenetic system: The systematization of organisms on the basis of their phylogenies. (Original: das phylogenetische System) Chicester: Wiley, 1987.
- Multicellular animals: The phylogenetic system of the Metazoa (Original: Das System der Metazoa) Berlin: Springer, 1996-2003. (3 vols.)
  - Ax, Peter (6 December 2012) [First published 1 January 1996]. Multicellular Animals Volume I: A new Approach to the Phylogenetic Order in Nature. Translated by Dunmer, Richard. Berlin: Springer. ISBN 9783642801143.
  - Ax, Peter (28 August 2000). Multicellular Animals, Volume II: The Phylogenetic System of the Metazoan. Translated by Dunmer, Richard. Berlin: Springer. ISBN 9783540674061.
  - Ax, Peter (14 March 2013) [First published 8 April 2003]. Multicellular Animals: Volume III: Order in Nature - System Made by Man. Translated by Dunmer, Richard. Berlin: Springer. ISBN 9783662088746.
