= Aprostatum =

Scientific classification
- Kingdom: Animalia
- Phylum: Platyhelminthes
- Order: Polycladida
- Suborder: Acotylea
- Family: Euplanidae
- Genus: Aprostatum; Bock, 1913

Species of flatworm

Aprostatum is a genus of flatworms belonging to the family Euplanidae.

== Description ==
Members of Aprostatum have an elongated or oval body. Some species have well-developed marginal eyes. The penis has a sclerotised stylet. Lang's vesicle, a seminal bursa in flatworms, is also present.

== Taxonomy ==
The following species are currently recognized in Aprostatum:

- Aprostatum clippertoni (Hyman, 1939)
- Aprostatum longipenis (Kato, 1943)
- Aprostatum stiliferum Bock, 1913
