= Polyposthiidae =

Scientific classification
- Domain: Eukaryota
- Kingdom: Animalia
- Phylum: Platyhelminthes
- Order: Polycladida
- Suborder: Acotylea
- Family: Polyposthiidae; Bergendal, 1893

Family of flatworms

Polyposthiidae is a family of flatworms belonging to the order Acotylea.

== Taxonomy ==
The following genera are currently accepted in Polyposthiidae:

- Bergendalia Laidlaw, 1903
- Cryptocelides Bergendal, 1890
- Metaposthia Palombi, 1923
- Polyphalloplana Beauchamp, 1951
- Polyposthia Bergendal, 1893
- Polyposthides Ralombi, 1923
