= Limnostylochidae =

Scientific classification
- Kingdom: Animalia
- Phylum: Platyhelminthes
- Order: Polycladida
- Family: Limnostylochidae

Family of flatworms

Limnostylochidae is a family of flatworms belonging to the order Polycladida.

Genera:

- Limnoplana Faubel, 1983
- Limnostylochus Bock, 1913
