= Callioplanidae =

Scientific classification
- Kingdom: Animalia
- Phylum: Platyhelminthes
- Order: Polycladida
- Suborder: Acotylea
- Family: Callioplanidae; Hyman, 1953

Synonyms
- Diplosoleniidae Bock, 1913

Family of flatworms

Callioplanidae is a family of flatworms belonging to the order Polycladida.

Genera:

- Ancoratheca Prudhoe, 1982
- Asolenia Hyman, 1959
- Callioplana Stimpson, 1857
- Crassiplana Hyman, 1955
- Discostylochus Bock, 1925
- Kaburakia Bock, 1925
- Koinostylochus Faubel, 1983
- Meixneria Bock, 1913
- Munseoma Bulnes, Faubel & Park, 2005
- Neostylochus Yeri & Kaburaki, 1920
- Okakarus Holleman, 2007
- Parastylochus Bock, 1913
- Tokiphallus Faubel, 1983
- Trigonoporus Lang, 1884
