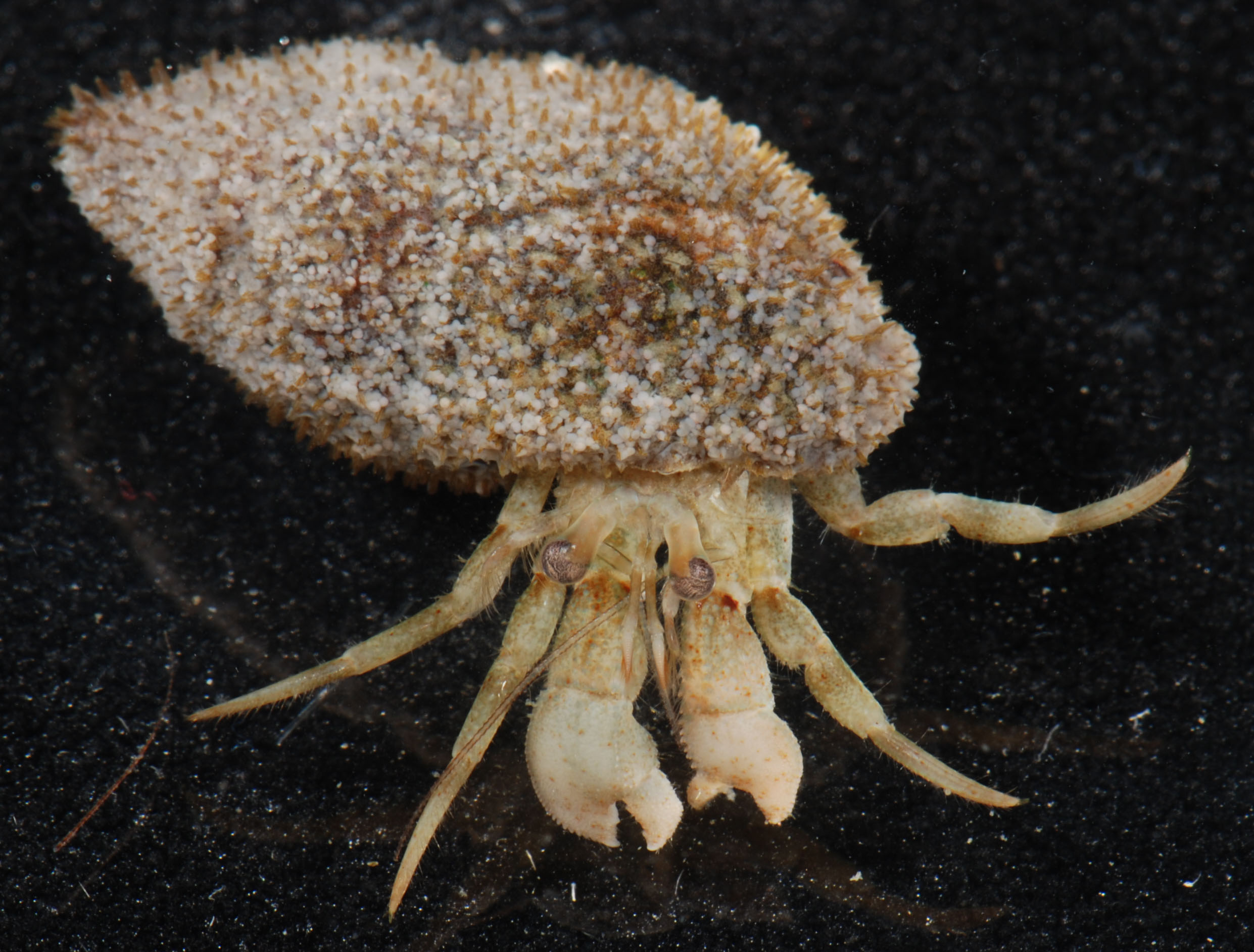

Scientific classification
- Kingdom: Animalia
- Phylum: Arthropoda
- Clade: Pancrustacea
- Class: Malacostraca
- Order: Decapoda
- Suborder: Pleocyemata
- Infraorder: Anomura
- Family: Paguridae
- Genus: Pagurus
- Species: P. pollicaris

Binomial name
- Pagurus pollicaris Say, 1817

= Pagurus pollicaris =

Species of crustacean

Pagurus pollicaris is a hermit crab commonly found along the Atlantic coast of North America from New Brunswick to the Gulf of Mexico. It is known by a number of common names, including gray hermit crab, flat-clawed hermit crab, flatclaw hermit crab, shield hermit crab, thumb-clawed hermit crab, broad-clawed hermit crab, and warty hermit crab.

P. pollicaris inhabits the shells of shark eye snails and whelks. It grows to a length of 31 millimetres (1.2 in) and a width of 25 mm (1.0 in). The crab is a pale off-white with unevenly sized, broad, flat claws that can lock together to act as an operculum when the crab withdraws into its shell. The shell is often shared by the commensal zebra flatworm (Stylochus ellipticus).

The diet of the flat-clawed hermit crab comprises organic matter, algae, and sometimes other hermit crabs. Fish are the most important predators of this species.
