= Faubelidae =

Scientific classification
- Kingdom: Animalia
- Phylum: Platyhelminthes
- Order: Polycladida
- Suborder: Acotylea
- Superfamily: Leptoplanoidea
- Family: Faubelidae; Özdikmen, 2010

Synonyms
- Notocirridae Faubel, 1983

Family of flatworms

Faubelidae is a family of flatworms belonging to the order Acotylea.

== Taxonomy ==
The family Faubelidae was previously under the name Notocirridae, named for its type genus of Notocirrus Faubel, 1983. However, a separate genus of polychaetes under the same name already existed, being Notocirrus Schmarda, 1861; this made Faubel's Notocirrus invalid under the International Code of Zoological Nomenclature, being a junior homonym. With this, Faubel's Notocirrus was replaced with the eponymous Faubelus by Hüseyin Özikmen of Gazi University, who further proposed the replacement of Notocirridae with Faubelidae for this reason.

The family currently contains the following genera:

- Amyris Er. Marcus & Ev. Marcus, 1968
- Chiliplana Faubel, 1983
- Copidoplana Bock, 1913
- Diplandros Hyman, 1953
- Faubelus Özdikmen, 2010
- Notoplehnia Faubel, 1983
- Triadomma Marcus, 1947
- Tripyloplana Faubel, 1983
