= Cryptocelidae =

Scientific classification
- Domain: Eukaryota
- Kingdom: Animalia
- Phylum: Platyhelminthes
- Order: Polycladida
- Suborder: Acotylea
- Family: Cryptocelidae; Laidlaw, 1903

Synonyms
- Cryptocelididae Laidlaw, 1903

Family of flatworms

Cryptocelidae is a family of flatworms.

== Genera ==
The following genera are recognised in the family Cryptocelidae:

- Adenodactyloplana Bulnes, Faubel & Ponce de Leon, 2003
- Cryptocelis Lang, 1884
- Hylocelis Faubel, 1983
- Macginitiella Hyman, 1953
- Multisepta Cuadrado, Moro & Norena, 2017
- Notoplanella Bock, 1931
- Phaenocelis Stummer-Traunfels, 1933
