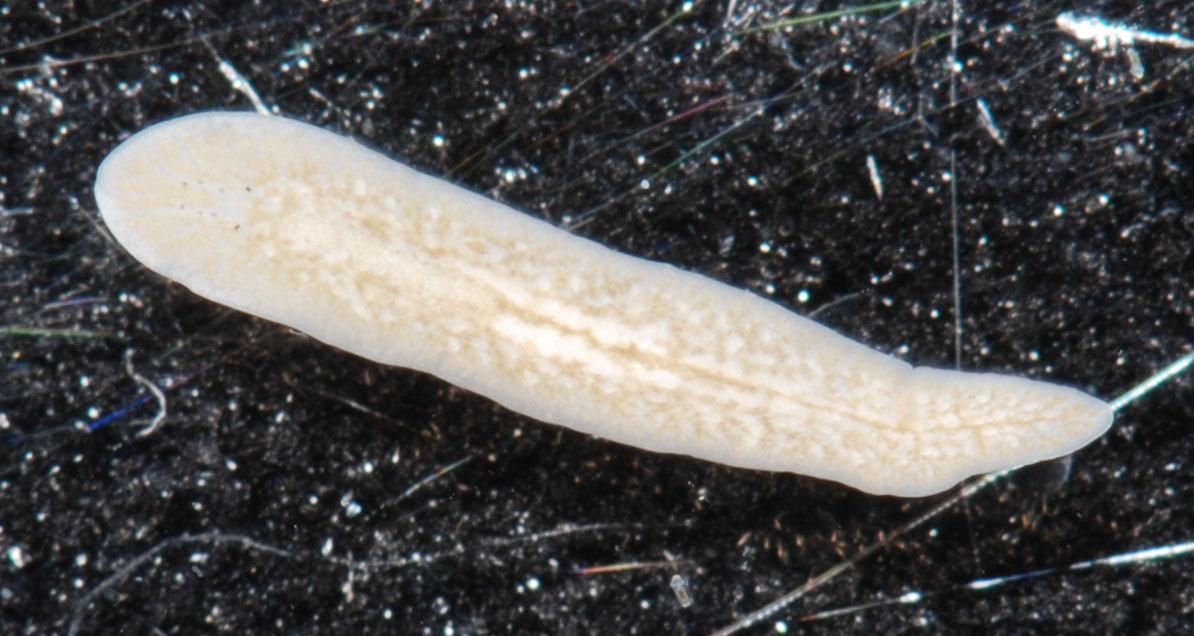
- Euplana gracilis

Scientific classification
- Kingdom: Animalia
- Phylum: Platyhelminthes
- Order: Polycladida
- Suborder: Acotylea
- Family: Euplanidae

= Euplanidae =

Family of flatworms

Euplanidae is a family of flatworms belonging to the order Polycladida.

Genera:

- Aprostatum Bock, 1913
- Diplopharyngeata Plehn, 1896
- Euplana Girard, 1893
- Euplanina Sopott-Ehlers & Schmidt, 1975
- Euplanoida Faubel, 1983
- Haploplana Laidlaw, 1903
- Namyhplana Brusa & Damborenea, 2013
- Paraprostatum Faubel & Sluys, 2007
- Semonia Plehn, 1896
- Taenioplana Hyman, 1944
