= Anno Faubel =

German zoologist

- Born: 30 September 1942
- Died: 20 February 2024 (aged 81)
- Scientific career
- Fields: Zoology, Helminthology
- Workplaces: University of Hamburg
- Doctoral advisor: Peter Ax
- Author abbrev. (zoology): Faubel

Anno Faubel (30 September 1942 – 20 February 2024) was a German zoologist.

== Work ==
Most of Faubel's works were focused on the taxonomy and ecology of acoels and flatworms, especially those of the order Polycladida, from the North and Baltic Seas, as well as Australia.
