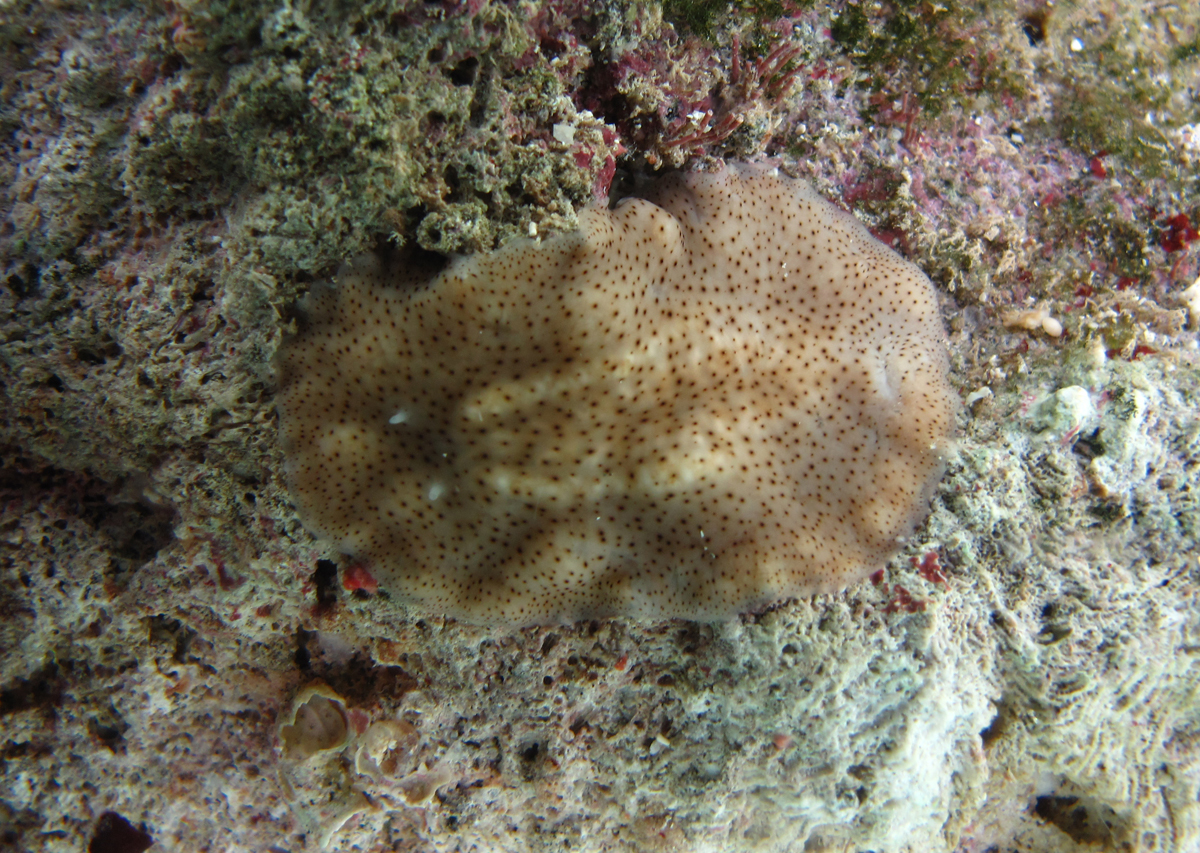
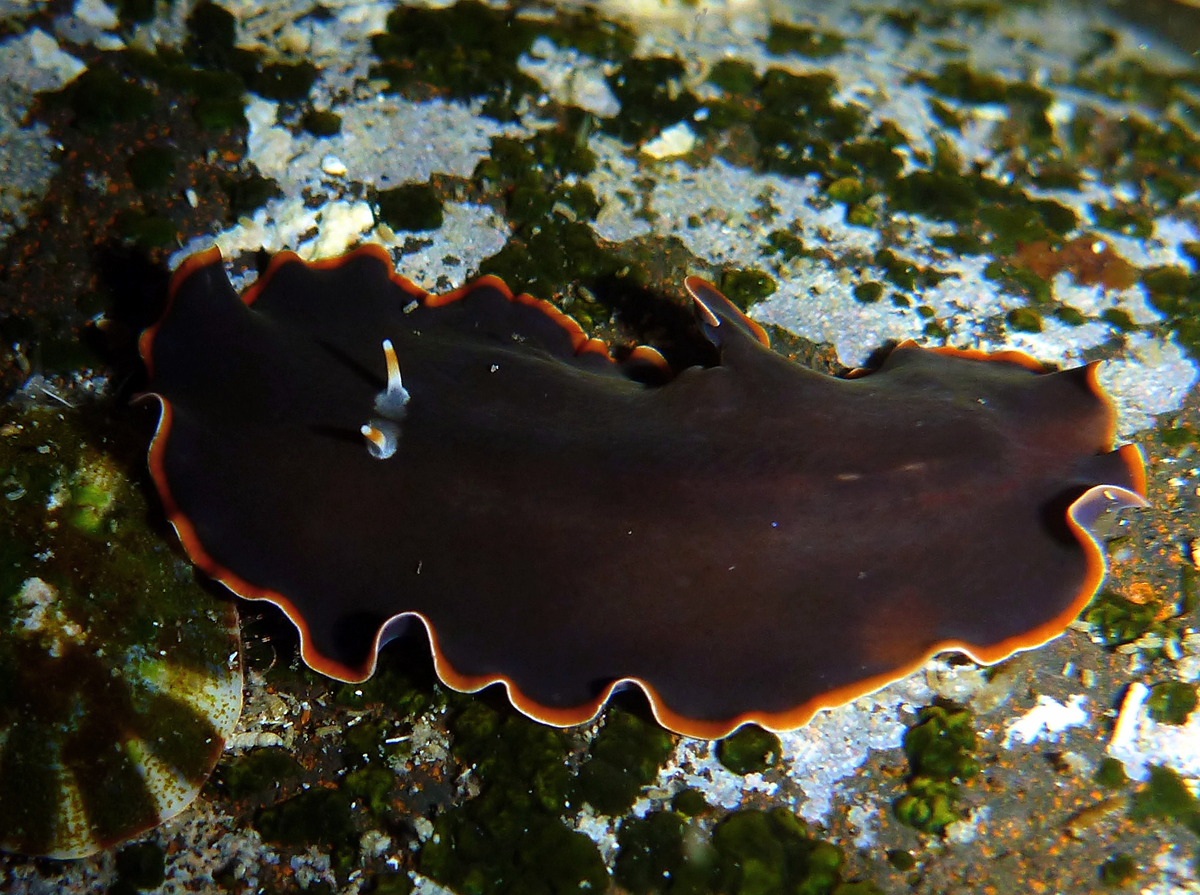
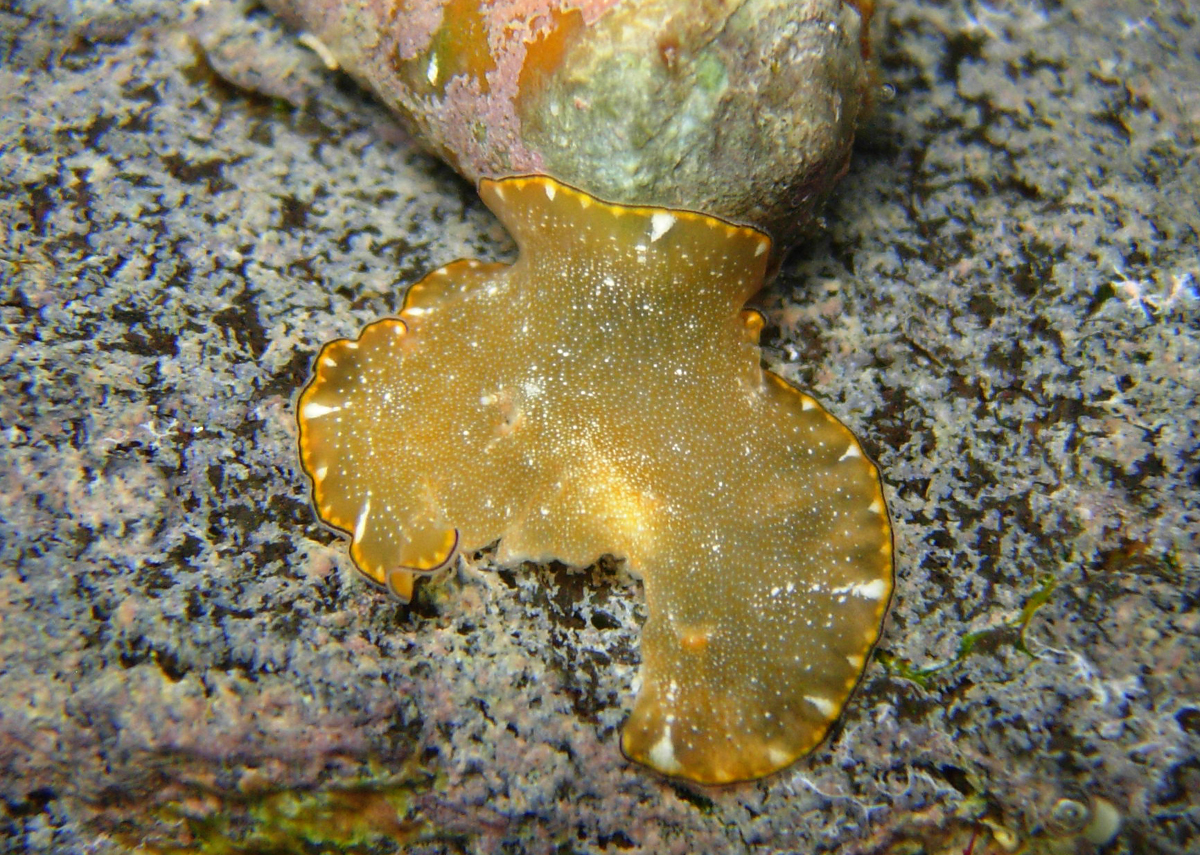
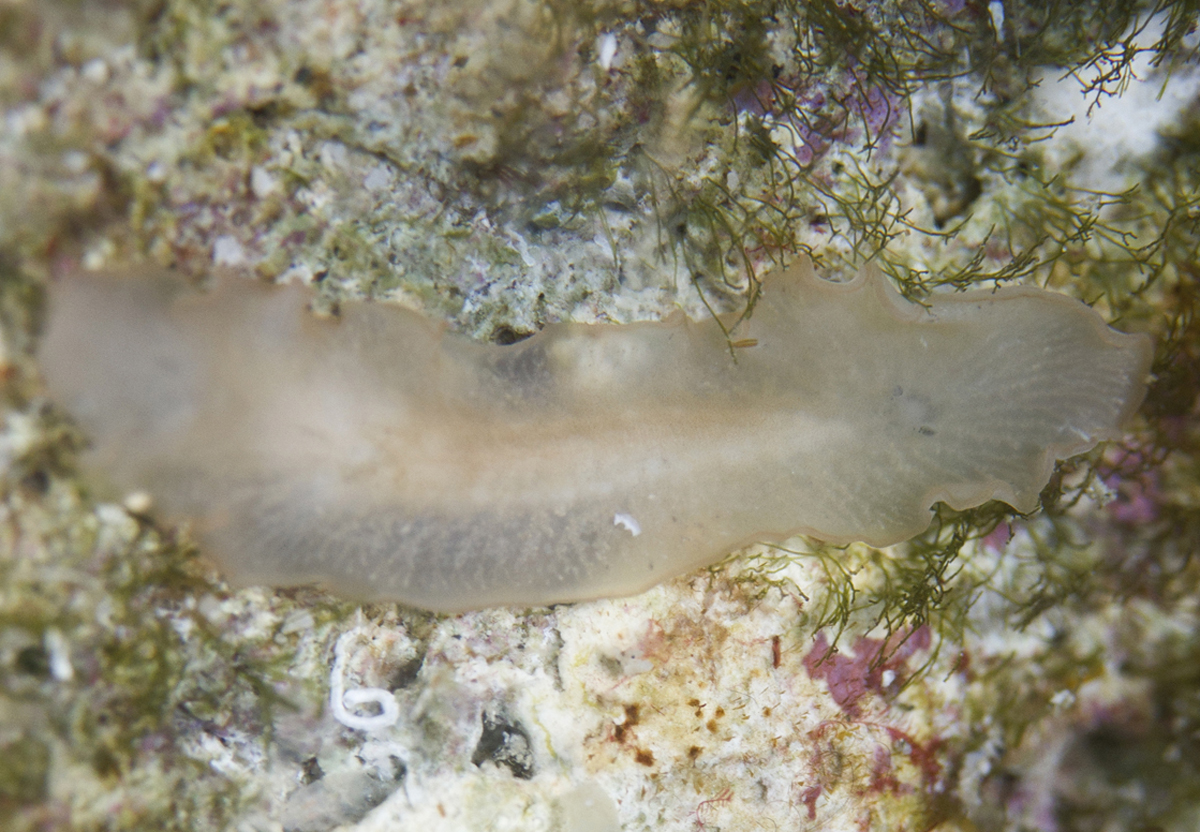
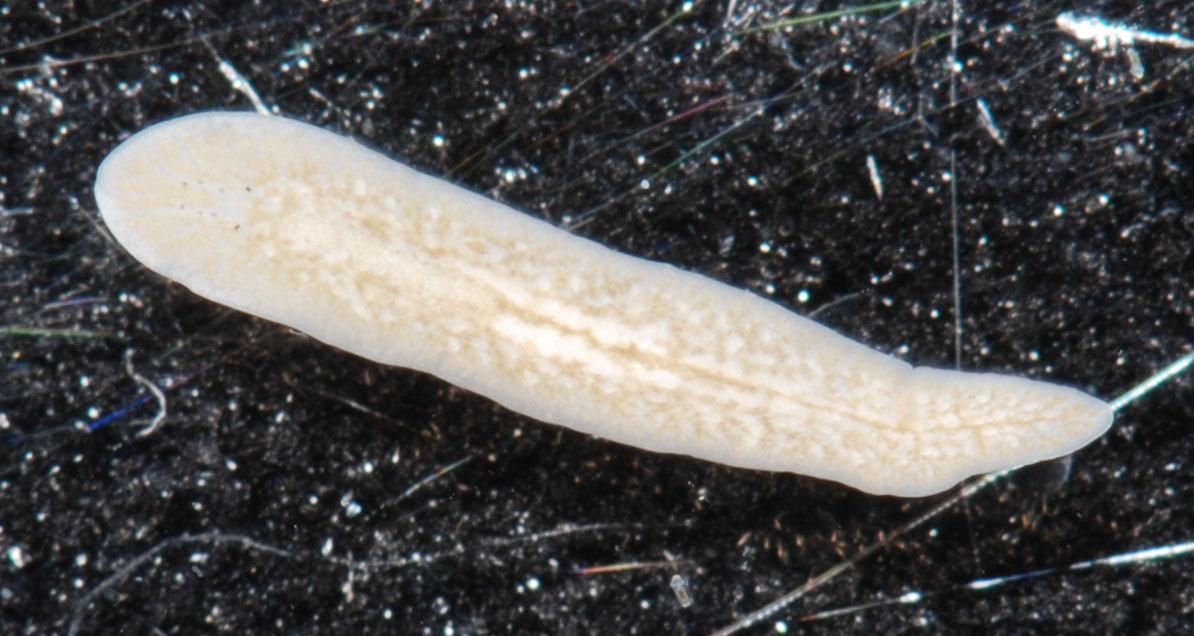
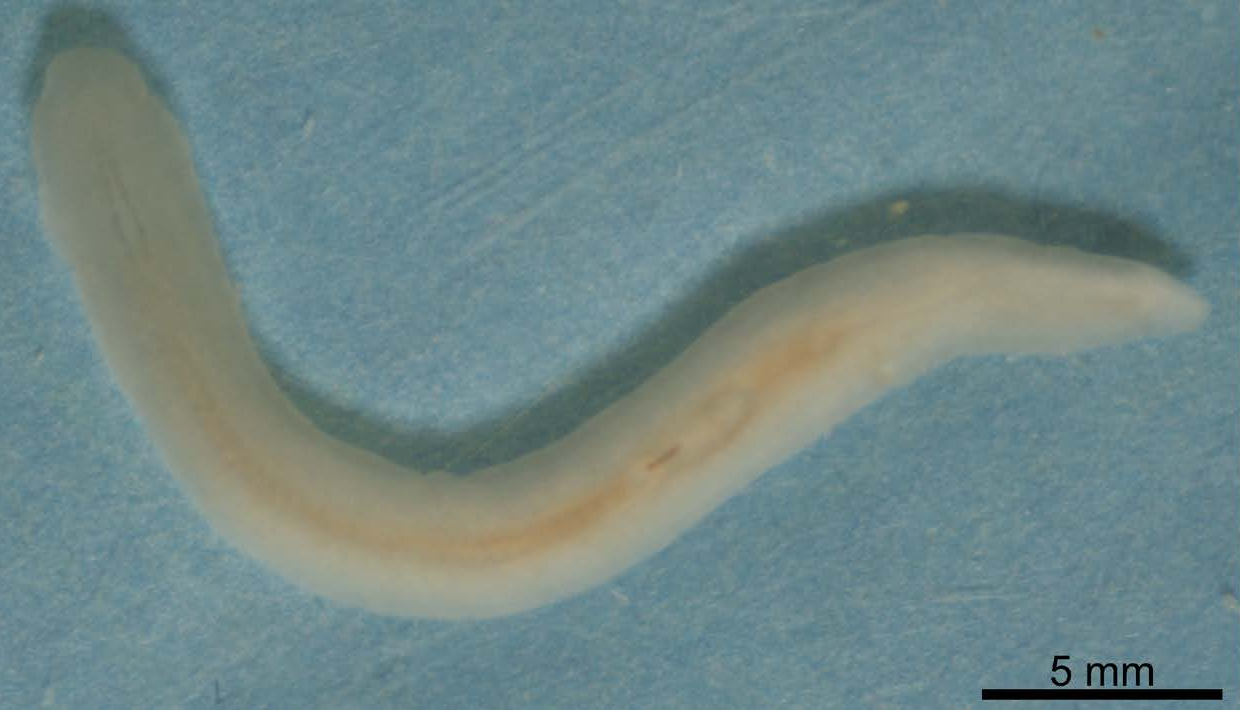
- From the left to right of each row, from top to bottom: Stylochus stellatus, Callioplana marginata, and Paraplanocera marginata (Stylochoidea); Leptoplanoidea indet., Euplana gracilis, and Chimaeriplana japonica (Leptoplanoidea)

Scientific classification
- Kingdom: Animalia
- Phylum: Platyhelminthes
- Order: Polycladida
- Suborder: Acotylea; Lang, 1884

Synonyms
- Acotylina Pearse, 1936

= Acotylea =

Acotylea Temporal range: Cretaceous–Present, ~120–0 Ma Based on a molecular clock analysis

Suborder of flatworms

Acotylea is a suborder of free-living marine turbellarian flatworms in the order Polycladida.

== Description ==
As currently defined, Acotylea includes polyclads with a Lang's vesicle in the female reproductive system and the male copulatory apparatus directed backwards. When tentacles are present, they are nuchal. The eyespot groups can be nuchal, cerebral, and marginal.

== Taxonomy ==
The internal classification of Acotylea has been unstable, with some genera and families constantly changing place as new molecular and morphological data are analyzed. The current classification is presented below:

- Superfamily Discoceloidea Laidaw, 1903
  - Family Discocelidae Laidlaw, 1903
  - Family Ilyplanidae Faubel, 1983
  - Family Cryptocelidae Laidlaw, 1903
  - Family Polyposthiidae Bergendal, 1893
- Superfamily Leptoplanoidea Faubel, 1984
  - Family Candimboididae Faubel, 1983
  - Family Euplanidae Er. Marcus & Ev. Marcus, 1966
  - Family Faubelidae Ozdikmen, 2010
  - Family Gnesiocerotidae Marcus and Marcus, 1966
  - Family Leptoplanidae Stimpson, 1857
  - Family Mucroplanidae Faubel, 1983
  - Family Notocomplanidae Litvaitis, Bolaños & Quiroga, 2019
  - Family Notoplanidae Marcus and Marcus, 1966
  - Family Palauidae Faubel, 1983
  - Family Pleioplanidae Faubel, 1983
  - Family Pseudostylochidae Faubel, 1983
  - Family Stylochoplanidae Meixner, 1907
- Superfamily Stylochoidea Stimpson, 1857
  - Family Callioplanidae Hyman, 1953
  - Family Discoprosthididae Faubel, 1983
  - Family Hoploplanidae Stummer-Traunfels, 1933
  - Family Idioplanidae Dittmann, Cuadrado, Aguado, Noreña & Egger, 2019
  - Family Latocestidae Laidlaw, 1903
  - Family Planoceridae Lang, 1884
  - Family Plehniidae Bock, 1913
  - Family Stylochidae Stimpson, 1857
- Not placed in any Superfamily
  - Family Anocellidae Quiroga, Bolanos & Litvaitis, 2006
  - Family Apidioplanidae Bock, 1926
  - Family Didangiidae Faubel, 1983
  - Family Enantiidae Graff, 1889
  - Family Limnostylochidae Faubel, 1983
  - Family Stylochocestidae Bock, 1913

== See also ==
- Kaburakia excelsa
