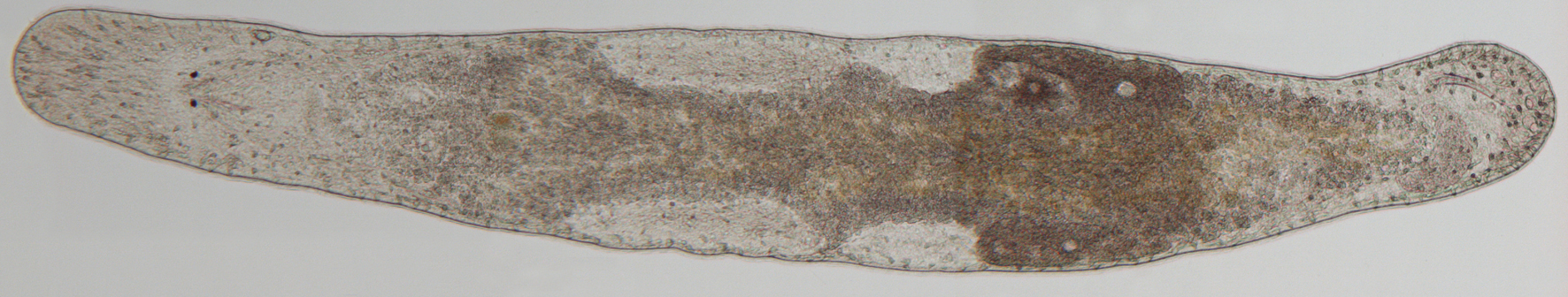
- Macrostomum lignano, a rhabditophoran

Scientific classification
- Kingdom: Animalia
- Phylum: Platyhelminthes
- Subphylum: Rhabditophora; Ehlers, 1985

Subgroups
- See text

= Rhabditophora =

Rhabditophora Temporal range: 508–0 Ma

Class of flatworms

Rhabditophora (from rhabdito-, rhabdite + Greek -φορος [-phoros], bearer, i.e., "rhabdite bearers") is a subphylum (previously a class) of flatworms. It includes all parasitic flatworms (clade Neodermata) and most free-living species that were previously grouped in the now obsolete class Turbellaria. Therefore, it contains the majority of the species in the phylum Platyhelminthes, excluding only the catenulids, to which they appear to be the sister group.

The clade Rhabditophora was originally erected by Ulrich Ehlers in 1985 based on morphological analyses and its monophyly was later confirmed by molecular studies.

== Description ==
Rhabditophorans are characterized by the presence of lamellated rhabdites, rodlike granules secreted in the cells of the epidermis and consisted of concentric lamellae. They are absent in the clade Neodermata, most likely due to a secondary loss of this feature because their epidermis is turned into a syncytium in adult forms.

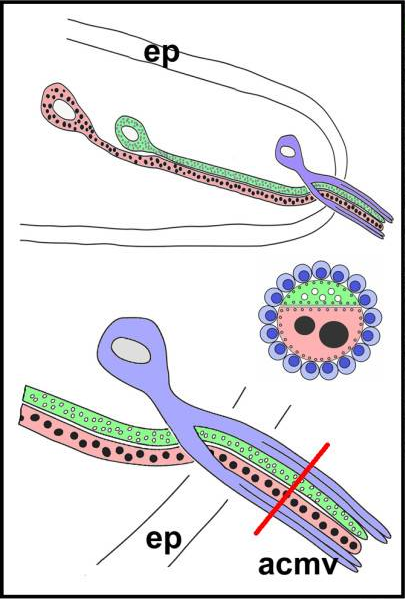
Scheme of the duo-gland adhesive system of the rhabditophoran Macrostomum lignano: red = adhesive gland; green = releasing gland; blue = anchor cell; ep = epidermis; acmv = anchor cell microvilli.

Another important synapomorphy of the group is the duo-glandular adhesive system. It is a structure of the epidermis containing three different cell types: anchor cells, adhesive glands and releasing glands. The adhesive glands secrete an adhesive substance that attaches the anchor cells to a surface, while the releasing glands secrete a substance able to release the anchor cells from surfaces. This systems allows rhabditophorans to adhere and release quickly from the substrate, even several times in a second.

The secretory organs of rhabditophorans, the protonephridia, also have a unique anatomy in which the flame cells and tube cells present a series of cytoplasmic projections that overlap, forming a two-cell 'weir'.

== Systematics ==
The following orders are recognised in the subphylum Rhabditophora:

- Order Bothrioplanida
- Order Fecampiida
- Order Gnosonesimida
- Order Polycladida
- Order Prolecithophora
- Order Prorhynchida
- Order Proseriata
- Order Rhabdocoela
- Order Tricladida
- Superorder Macrostomorpha
  - Genus Bradynectes
  - Genus Myozona
  - Family Haplopharyngidae
  - Family Macrostomidae
  - Order Dolichomicrostomida
- Superclass Neodermata (parasites)
  - Class Cestoda
    - Subclass Cestodaria
      - Order Amphilinidea
      - Order Gyrocotylidea
    - Subclass Eucestoda
      - Order Bothriocephalidea
      - Order Caryophyllidea
      - Order Cathetocephalidea
      - Order Cyclophyllidea
      - Order Diphyllidea
      - Order Diphyllobothriidea
      - Order Lecanicephalidea
      - Order Litobothriidea
      - Order Onchoproteocephalidea
      - Order Phyllobothriidea
      - Order Rhinebothriidea
      - Order Spathebothriidea
      - Order Tetrabothriidea
      - Order Tetraphyllidea
      - Order Trypanorhyncha
  - Class Monogenea
    - Subclass Monopisthocotylea
      - Order Capsalidea
      - Order Dactylogyridea
      - Order Gyrodactylidea
      - Order Monocotylidea
      - Order Montchadskyellidea
    - Subclass Polyopisthocotylea
      - Order Chimaericolidea
      - Order Diclybothriidea
      - Order Lagarocotylidea
      - Order Mazocraeidea
      - Order Polystomatidea
  - Class Trematoda
    - Subclass Aspidogastrea
      - Order Aspidogastrida
      - Order Stichocotylida
    - Subclass Digenea
      - Order Diplostomida
      - Order Plagiorchiida
