= Otomesostoma auditivum =

Scientific classification
- Domain: Eukaryota
- Kingdom: Animalia
- Phylum: Platyhelminthes
- Order: Proseriata
- Family: Otomesostomatidae
- Genus: Otomesostoma
- Species: O. auditivum

Binomial name
- Otomesostoma auditivum (Du Plessis, 1874)

Synonyms
- Automolus morgiensis (Du Plessis, 1886); Automolus morgiensis Zschokke, 1900; Mesostoma auditivum Du Plessis, 1874; Mesostoma morgiense Du Plessis, 1876; Monotus lacustris Zacharias, 1890; Monotus morgiense Du Plessis, 1886; Monotus morgiensis (Du Plessis, 1884); Monotus relictus Zacharias, 1885; Otomesostoma morgiense von Graff, 1882; Otomesostoma morgiensis (Du Plessis, 1876)

Species of flatworm

Otomesostoma auditivum is a free-living, hermaphroditic flatworm in the order Proseriata, found in brackish and freshwater environments. It is a palearctic species living in shallow-water coastal habitats, and occurring in some freshwater lakes far from the sea.

== Taxonomy ==
This flatworm was first described in 1874 by the French zoologist Georges Du Plessis who gave it the name Mesostoma auditivum. Because of its unique characteristics, in 1882 Ludwig von Graff erected the genus Otomesostoma to accommodate it and it became Otomesostoma auditivum. It is one of only two species in the genus, the other being Otomesostoma arovi, described from Lake Baikal by Timoshkin, Lukhnev and Zaytseva in 2010.

== Distribution ==
Otomesostoma auditivum is mainly known from marine and brackish water habitats, but it is also found in freshwater locations. It is a holarctic species and has been recorded from the North Atlantic Ocean and the Baltic Sea, including United States, Greenland, Iceland, Finland, Sweden, Germany, Ireland, United Kingdom, Italy, Switzerland, the Ural Mountains and Lake Baikal. It is a benthic species and its depth range in marine habitats is between 4 and 10 m (13 and 33 ft). In Echo Lake in the Sierra Nevada, California, it is found at between 15 and 45 m (50 and 150 ft) whereas in some Alpine lakes in Europe it occurs at depths of 145 m (480 ft).

In Lake Baikal, it coexists with endemic related species of flatworm in the shallows, its first record in Asia and a rare example of the Palearctic and Baikalian faunas coming into contact with each other. It is one of several flatworms more familiar from marine or brackish water habitats that have appeared in the Konin Lakes in central Poland since two power stations started discharging water into the lakes, raising their temperature markedly.

== Genome ==
The genome size of Otomesostoma auditivum is 18,390 Mb (megabases), the largest genome of any known flatworm species, and nearly six times as large as the human genome (3200 Mb).
