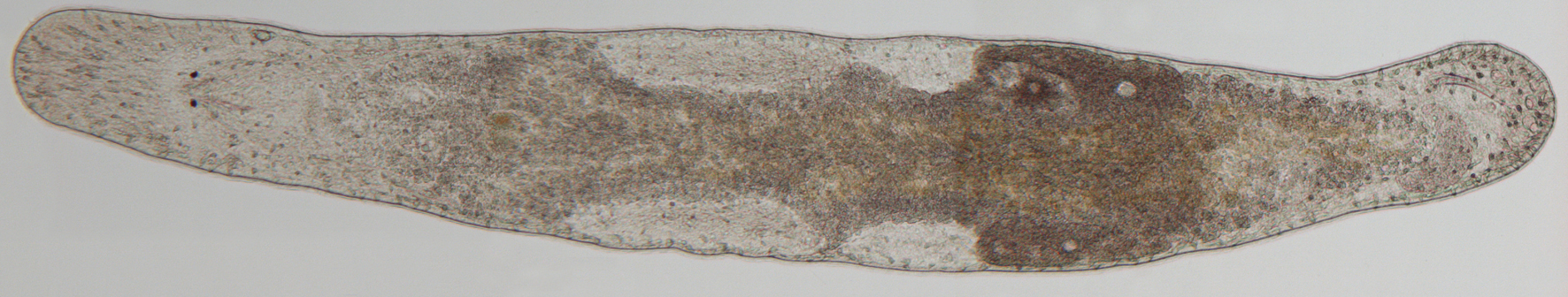
- Macrostomum lignano

Scientific classification
- Kingdom: Animalia
- Phylum: Platyhelminthes
- Subphylum: Rhabditophora
- Subclass: Macrostomorpha; Doe, 1986

Subordinate taxa
- Family Haplopharyngidae; Family Macrostomidae; Clade Dolichomicrostomida; Genus Bradynectes; Genus Myozona

= Macrostomorpha =

Clade of flatworms

Macrostomorpha is a clade of free living flatworms in the group Rhabditophora.

== Description ==
Species of Macrostomorpha are characterized by having the necks of the viscid gland and releasing gland emerging in a common collar of anchor cell microvilli. They also have aflagellate spermatozoa, post-oral neural commissure, and a protrusible simplex pharynx. Macrostomorpha constitute a basal group in Rhabditophora, showing such plesiomorphic condition as entolecithal eggs and spiral cleavage. Another trait found among members of the clade is the presence of hard stylet in the male copulatory organ.

== Phylogeny and systematics ==
Originally the clade Macrostomorpha was divided into two groups: Haplopharyngida (containing a single family, Haplopharyngidae) and Macrostomida (containing the families Macrostomidae, Microstomidae and Dolichomacrostomidae). However, molecular studies revealed that these groups are not monophyletic. The current phylogenetic classification is presented in the following tree:

- Macrostomorpha
  - Haplopharyngidae
  - - Macrostomidae
    - - Myozona
      - - Bradynectes
        - Dolichomicrostomida
          - Dolichomacrostomidae
          - Microstomidae
