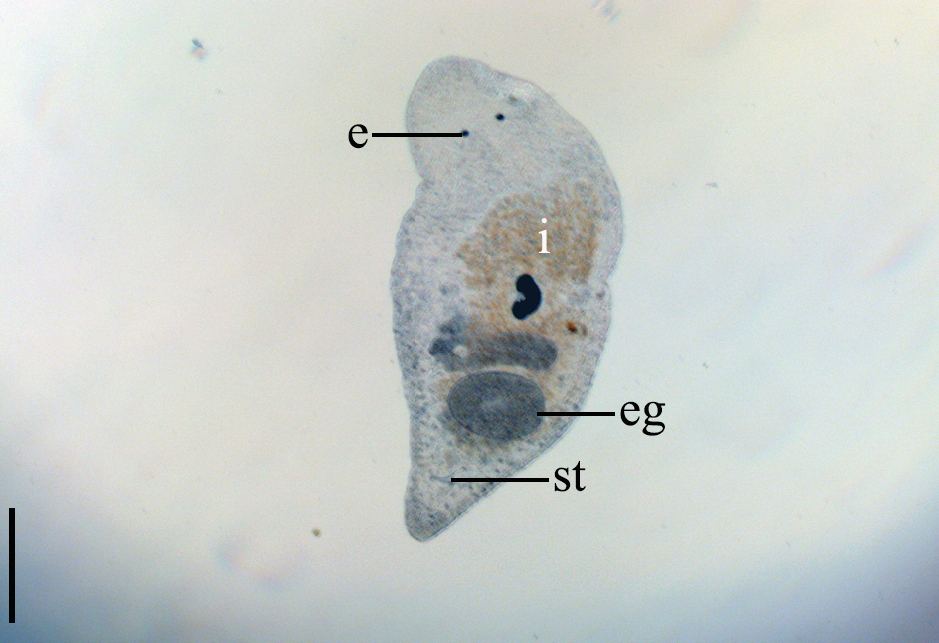

Scientific classification
- Domain: Eukaryota
- Kingdom: Animalia
- Phylum: Platyhelminthes
- Order: Macrostomida
- Family: Macrostomidae
- Genus: Macrostomum
- Species: M. rostratum

Binomial name
- Macrostomum rostratum Papi, 1959

Synonyms
- Macrostomum appendiculatum Beklemischev, 1922; Macrostomum phytophilum Beklemischev, 1951; Macrostomum viride rostrata Papi, 1951

= Macrostomum rostratum =

Species of flatworm

Macrostomum rostratum is a free-living, hermaphroditic flatworm in the family Macrostomidae, found in freshwater and brackish environments.

== Description ==
Macrostomum rostratum is colourless and between 0.2 and 2 mm (0.01 and 0.08 in) in length. There are a pair of small eyes at the anterior end and a longitudinal-slit mouth on the ventral surface just behind these. A short pharynx leads from the mouth to a simple gut. Also on the ventral surface, the female gonopore, which is shaped like a rosette, is in front of the male gonopore and penis which are half way along the flatworm. The posterior end of the worm bears an adhesive plate and can spread out to stick to a surface, and the edge of this region bears rodlike rhabdites (defensive structures) in the tissues.

== Distribution and habitat ==
Macrostomum rostratum occurs sporadically in the European coastline in the northeastern Atlantic Ocean, typically in the splash zone in both fresh and salt water. It is present in rock pools at Oxwich Bay and Port Erin in Wales, and in these locations it is found on sea lettuce (Ulva lactuca). Further afield, it has been recorded from a brackish coastal wetland in Peru. Another place where it occurs is the heated Konin Lakes, water bodies in central Poland where the water temperature is raised by the water being discharged from power stations.

== Ecology ==
Nematodes have been found parasitizing Macrostomum rostratum. The structure of the male copulatory device with its curved stylet may indicate that this species exhibits a hypodermic mating system.
