= Microstomum =

- Microstomum caudatum

Scientific classification
- Kingdom: Animalia
- Phylum: Platyhelminthes
- Order: Dolichomicrostomida
- Family: Microstomidae
- Genus: Microstomum; Schmidt, 1848

Genus of flatworms

Microstomum is a genus of flatworms in the family Microstomidae.

Species:

- Microstomum bioculatum Faubel, 1984
- Microstomum bispiralis Stirewalt, 1937
- Microstomum breviceps Marcus, 1951
- Microstomum canum Fuhrmann, 1894
- Microstomum caudatum Leidy, 1852
- Microstomum coerulescens (Schmarda, 1859)
- Microstomum crildensis Faubel, 1984
- Microstomum davenporti Graff, 1911
- Microstomum dermophthalmum Riedel, 1932
- Microstomum diplolethicum Steinböck, 1931
- Microstomum gabriellae Marcus, 1950
- Microstomum groenlandicum Levinsen, 1879
- Microstomum hamatum Westblad, 1952
- Microstomum hanatum Westblad, 1953
- Microstomum Jenseni Riedel, 1932
- Microstomum lineare (Müller OF, 1773)
- Microstomum littorale Ørsted, 1845
- Microstomum lucidum Fuhrmann, 1898
- Microstomum melanophthalmum Steinböck, 1933
- Microstomum mortenseni Riedel, 1932
- Microstomum mundum Graff, 1905
- Microstomum ornatum Uljanin, 1870
- Microstomum papillosum Graff, 1882
- Microstomum paradii Graff, 1913
- Microstomum philadelphicum Leidy, 1852
- Microstomum punctatum Dorner, 1902
- Microstomum rhabdotum Marcus, 1951
- Microstomum rubromaculatum Graff, 1882
- Microstomum septentrionale Sabussow, 1900
- Microstomum spiculifer Faubel, 1974
- Microstomum spiriferum Westblad, 1953
- Microstomum trichotum Marcus, 1950
- Microstomum ulum Marcus, 1950
- Microstomum variabile Leidy, 1851
