= Haplopharynx =

Scientific classification
- Kingdom: Animalia
- Phylum: Platyhelminthes
- Subclass: Macrostomorpha
- Family: Haplopharyngidae; Meixner, 1938
- Genus: Haplopharynx; Meixner, 1938

Genus of flatworms

Haplopharynx is a genus of small, free living marine flatworms found in the North Atlantic and the Mediterranean. It is the only genus in the monotypic family Haplopharyngidae.

== Species ==
The following species are recognized in the genus Haplopharynx:

- Haplopharynx quadristimulus Ax, 1971
- Haplopharynx rostratus Meixner, 1938
- Haplopharynx papii Schockaert, 2014

== Anatomy ==
Subterminal mouth leads to the simple pharynx, which subsequently continues as an intestine with terminal anal pore. A short retractable proboscis is present anteriorly to the pharynx. Variable number of glands producing rhabdites open at the surface of proboscis. Nervous system built similarly as in Macrostomida. Haplopharynx are hermaphroditic, with separate male and female gonopores. Male copulatory organ is equipped with hard, sclerotised stylet and set of needles.

== Reproduction and development ==
Copulation lead to the internal fertilization. Egg is entolecithal and show spiral cleavage pattern.
