= Otoplanidae =

Scientific classification
- Kingdom: Animalia
- Phylum: Platyhelminthes
- Order: Proseriata
- Infraorder: Lithophora
- Family: Otoplanidae; Hallez, 1892

Family of flatworms

Otoplanidae is a family of flatworms belonging to the order Proseriata. Members of the family are marine flatworms that typically inhabit the swash zone of sandy beaches worldwide.

== Systematics ==
Four subfamilies are recognised within Otoplanidae, distinguished mainly by the degree of ciliation of the body and the shape and position of the pharynx: Archotoplaninae, Bulbotoplaninae, Otoplaninae, and Parotoplaninae.

== Genera ==
Genera:

- Alaskaplana Ax & Armonies, 1990
- Americanaplana Ax & Ax, 1967
- Archotoplana Ax, 1956
