= Otomesostoma =

Scientific classification
- Kingdom: Animalia
- Phylum: Platyhelminthes
- Order: Proseriata
- Family: Otomesostomatidae
- Genus: Otomesostoma; Graff, 1882

Genus of flatworms

Otomesostoma is a genus of flatworms belonging to the family Otomesostomatidae.

Two species are recognized in this genus:

- Otomesostoma arovi Timoshkin, Lukhnev & Zaytseva, 2010
- Otomesostoma auditivum (Forel & Du Plessis, 1874) Hofsten, 1907
