= Nematoplanidae =

Scientific classification
- Kingdom: Animalia
- Phylum: Platyhelminthes
- Order: Proseriata
- Infraorder: Unguiphora
- Family: Nematoplanidae

Family of flatworms

Nematoplanidae is a family of flatworms belonging to the order Proseriata.

Genera:

- Ezoplana Tajika, 1982
- Nematoplana Meixner, 1938
- Tabaota Marcus, 1950
- Togarma Marcus, 1949
