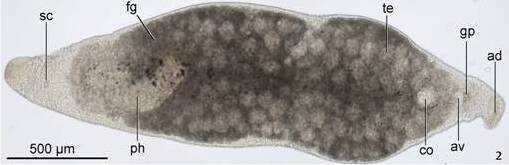
- Ectocotyla sp.

Scientific classification
- Kingdom: Animalia
- Phylum: Platyhelminthes
- Order: Proseriata
- Family: Monocelididae
- Genus: Ectocotyla; Hyman, 1944

= Ectocotyla =

Genus of flatworms

Ectocotyla is a genus of flatworms belonging to the family Monocelididae. They live as ectosymbionts on the surface of many species of decapods.

== Description ==
Species of Ectocotyla have a posterior adhesive disk to attach to the substrate. Their tegument has microvilli dorsally and cilia interspersed with microvilli ventrally. The pharynx, of the plicate type, is in the anterior third of the body. The ovaries lie behind the pharynx base, and the testes are ventral, between the pharynx and the penis. The male copulatory apparatus has a muscular prostatic vesicle and a tubular eversible penis. There is an accessory prostatic organ with a spicule in the midline behind the penis. The ventral and external vagina lies slightly to the left of the midline, between the penis and the spicule.

== Species ==
The following species are currently considered valid:

- Ectocotyla hirudo (Levinsen, 1879)
- Ectocotyla multitesticulata Fleming & Burt, 1978
