= Axia =

Axia may refer to:

- Axia (gens), an ancient Roman family
- Axia, a division of Telos Systems
- Axia, a Japanese market brand of cassette tapes and optical media by Fujifilm
- Axia (album), the 1985 debut album from Japanese singer Yuki Saito
- Axia (video game), a DOS game made by Dungeon Dwellers Design in 1998
- Axia College
- Axia NetMedia
- Perodua Axia, a car made by Malaysian company Perodua
- Axia, a fictional city in the Marvel Cinematic Universe film Ant-Man and the Wasp: Quantumania

Taxonomy

- Axia (moth), a moth genus in the family Cimeliidae
- Axia (flatworm), a worm genus in the family Macrostomidae
