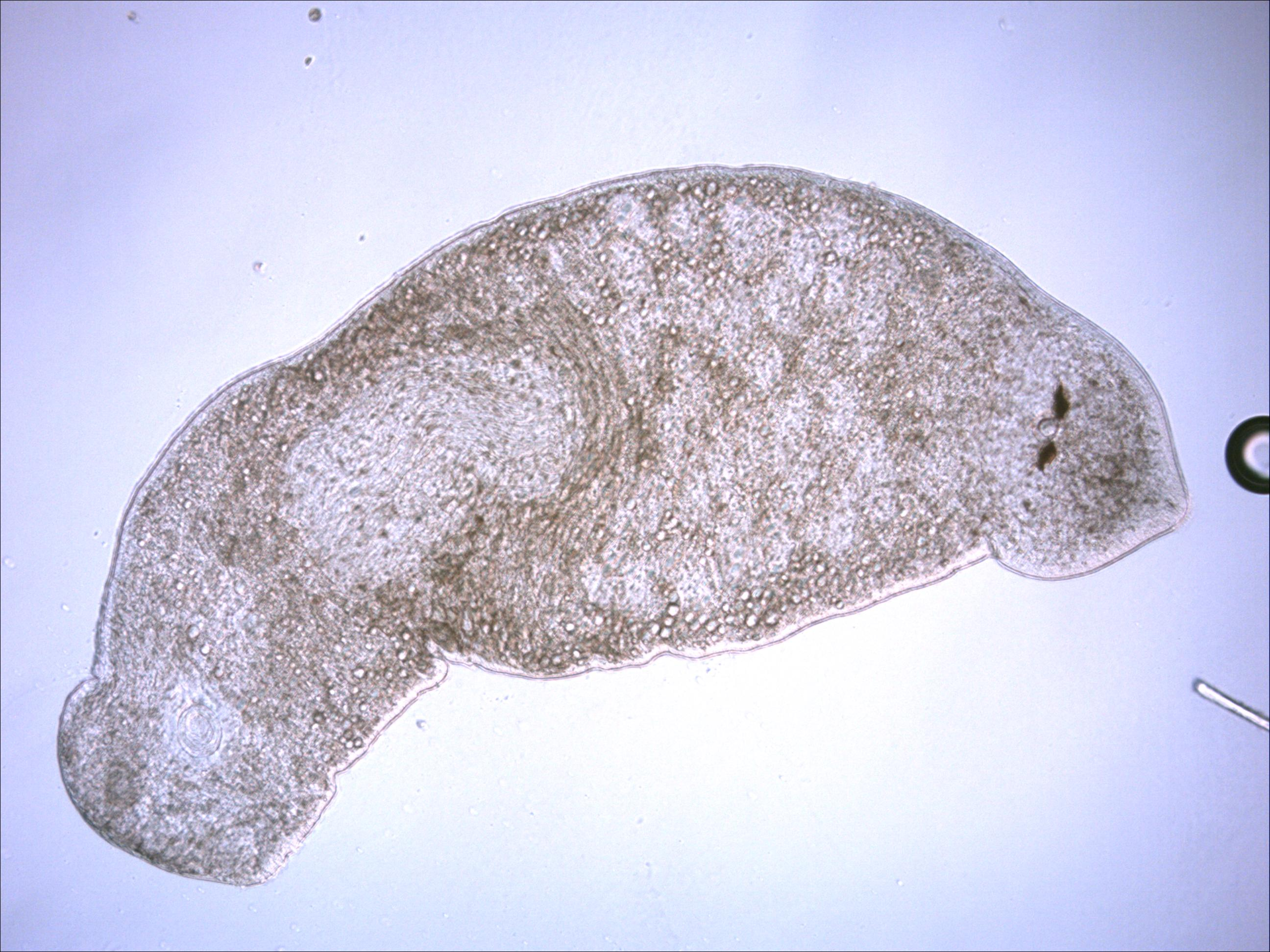
- Monocelis fusca

Scientific classification
- Kingdom: Animalia
- Phylum: Platyhelminthes
- Order: Proseriata
- Family: Monocelididae
- Genus: Monocelis; Ehrenberg, 1831

= Monocelis =

Genus of flatworms

Monocelis is a genus of flatworms belonging to the family Monocelididae.

The genus has cosmopolitan distribution.

Species:

- Monocelis alboguttata Curini-Galletti, 1991
- Monocelis algicola Curini-Galletti & Casu, 2016
- Monocelis anguilla Schmidt, 1857
- Monocelis anta Marcus, 1954
- Monocelis balanocephala (Bohmig, 1902)
- Monocelis beata Curini-Galletti & Cannon, 1996
- Monocelis cincta Karling, 1966
- Monocelis cirrhosa Marcus, 1949
- Monocelis colpotriplicis Tajika, 1982
- Monocelis corallicola Curini-Galletti & Cannon, 1996
- Monocelis durhami Hyman, 1964
- Monocelis exquisita Curini-Galletti & Casu, 2016
- Monocelis fasciata Graff, 1911
- Monocelis fuhrmanni Midelburg, 1908
- Monocelis fusca Örsted, 1843
- Monocelis galapagoensis Ax & Ax, 1977
- Monocelis gamblei Graff, 1893
- Monocelis gracilis (Meixner, 1938)
- Monocelis hopkinsi Karling, 1966
- Monocelis lacteus (Diesing, 1862)
- Monocelis lata Francotte, 1882
- Monocelis lineata (Müller, 1773) Oersted, 1843
- Monocelis longiceps (Duges, 1830)
- Monocelis longistyla Martens & Curini-Galletti, 1987
- Monocelis macrobulbus Curini-Galletti & Cannon, 1996
- Monocelis mediterranea Curini-Galletti & Mura, 1998
- Monocelis nexilis Curini-Galletti & Cannon, 1996
- Monocelis nitida Riedl, 1959
- Monocelis non-scripta Curini-Galletti, 2014
- Monocelis oculifera Ax & Ax, 1977
- Monocelis pardus (Marcus, 1954)
- Monocelis parvula Curini-Galletti & Mura, 1998
- Monocelis pictocephala Martens & Curini-Galletti, 1989
- Monocelis psilus (Marcus, 1954)
- Monocelis rotulifer Miller & Faubel, 2003
- Monocelis rupisrubrae Curini-Galletti & Cannon, 1996
- Monocelis spatulicauda (Girard, 1851)
- Monocelis spectator Sopott-Ehlers & Ax, 1985
- Monocelis tabira Marcus, 1950
- Monocelis tenella Karling, 1966
- Monocelis viridirostris Sabussow, 1900
- Monocelis viridorostris Sabussow, 1900
- Monocelis wilhelmii Graff, 1911
