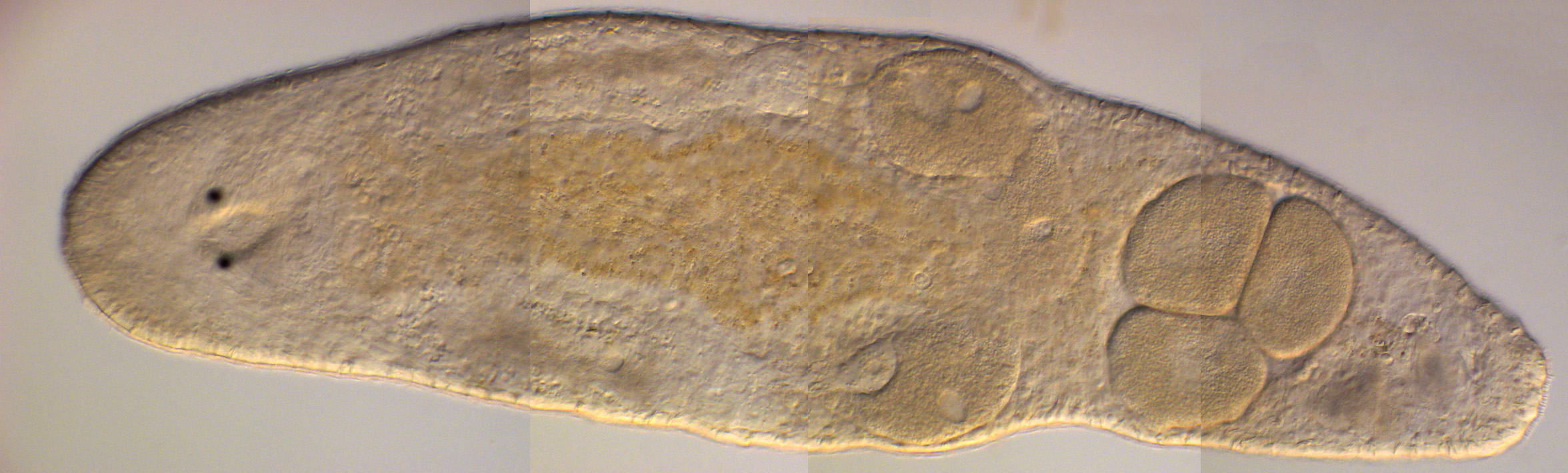
- Adult

Scientific classification
- Kingdom: Animalia
- Phylum: Platyhelminthes
- Family: Macrostomidae
- Genus: Macrostomum
- Species: M. hystrix

Binomial name
- Macrostomum hystrix Luther, 1905

= Macrostomum hystrix =

Species of flatworm

Macrostomum hystrix is a free-living flatworm in the family Macrostomidae. It is small, transparent, and a simultaneous hermaphrodite.

== Biology ==
Macrostomum hystrix is capable of hypodermic insemination. In this process, sperm is injected through the epidermis into the parenchyma of the mating partner. This is done by a needle-like stylet, which is the male copulatory organ. The stylet has a rigid and pointed distal thickening, as well as a subterminal stylet opening which can puncture the epidermis of the mating partner. The sperm are highly motile, small and simple, but have no flagellates. The female antrum shows a simple anatomy and is only involved in laying eggs.

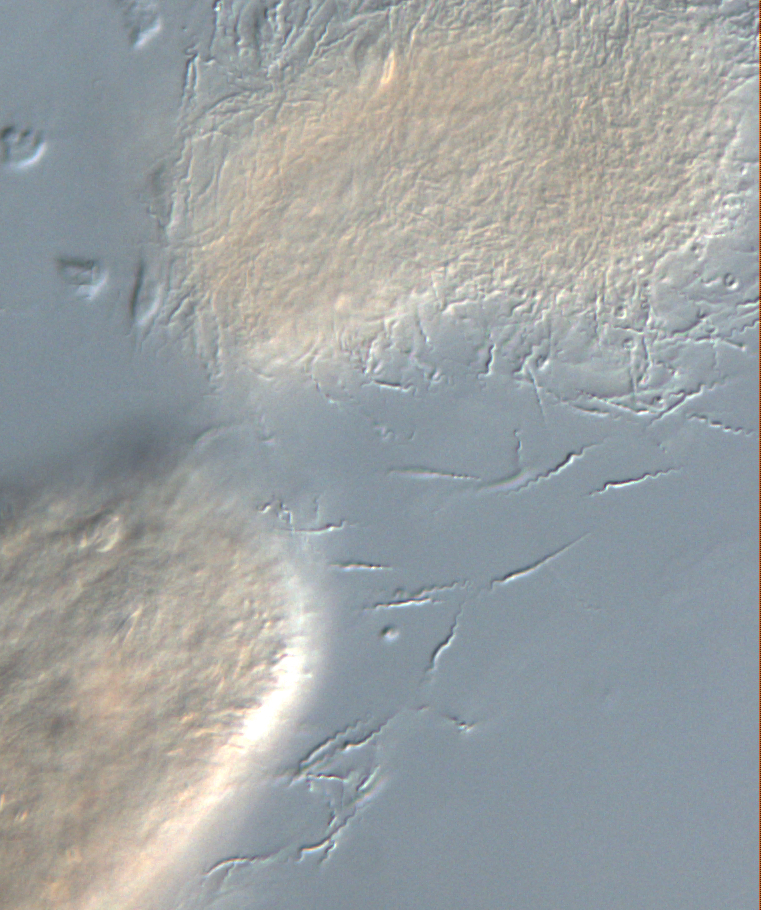
Sperm of Macrostomum hystrix

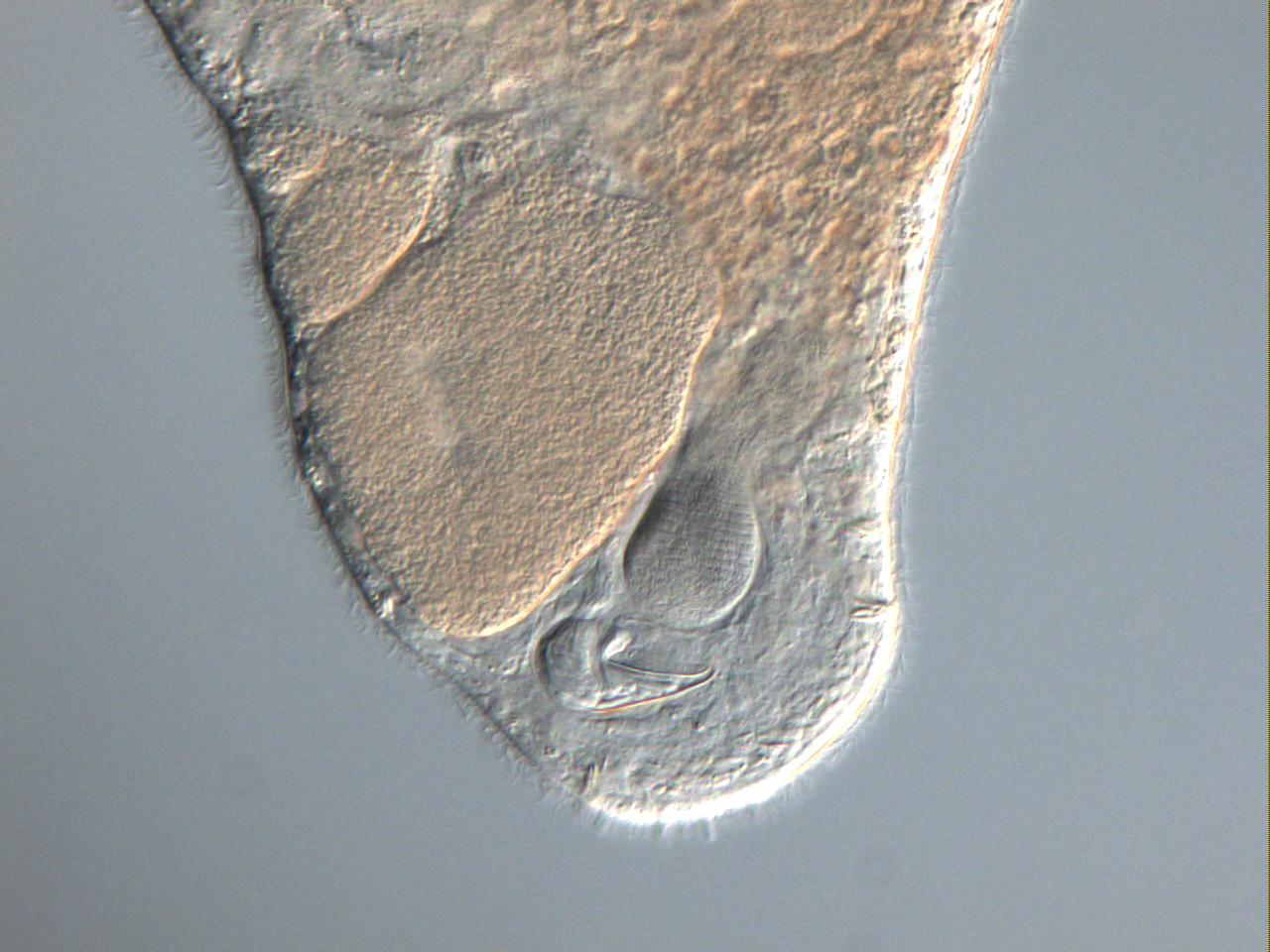
The needle-like stylet of Macrostomum hystrix. The seminal vesicle is visible, as are the developing eggs.

In isolated worms, it has been shown that Macrostomum hystrix does not only use hypodermic insemination for outbreeding but also self-fertilization, or "selfing". To achieve this, they inject their sperm into themselves — mainly into their own heads, due to physical constraints. From there, the sperm apparently migrate to the site of fertilization. Worms that were isolated showed significantly more sperm in their heads, compared to worms that had the opportunity to cross-fertilize. Macrostomum hystrix prefers outbreeding if partners are available because selfing also has costs. The amount of offspring of worms that selfed is reduced, as is the offspring's survival. As a consequence, Macrostomum hystrix only begins selfing in the extended absence of mating partners: delayed selfing represents a conditional reproductive strategy which allows them to deal with periodic conditions of low mate abundance.
