= Bradburia =

Bradburia may refer to:

- Bradburia (plant), a plant genus in the family Asteraceae
- Bradburia (flatworm), a worm genus in the family Macrostomidae
