= Archimonocelididae =

Scientific classification
- Kingdom: Animalia
- Phylum: Platyhelminthes
- Order: Proseriata
- Infraorder: Lithophora
- Family: Archimonocelididae; Meixner, 1938

Family of flatworms

Archimonocelididae is a family of flatworms belonging to the order Proseriata.

Genera:

- Archimonocelis Meixner, 1938
- Dreuxiola Schockaert, Curini-Galletti, De Ridder, Volonterio & Artois, 2009
- Meidiama Marcus, 1946
