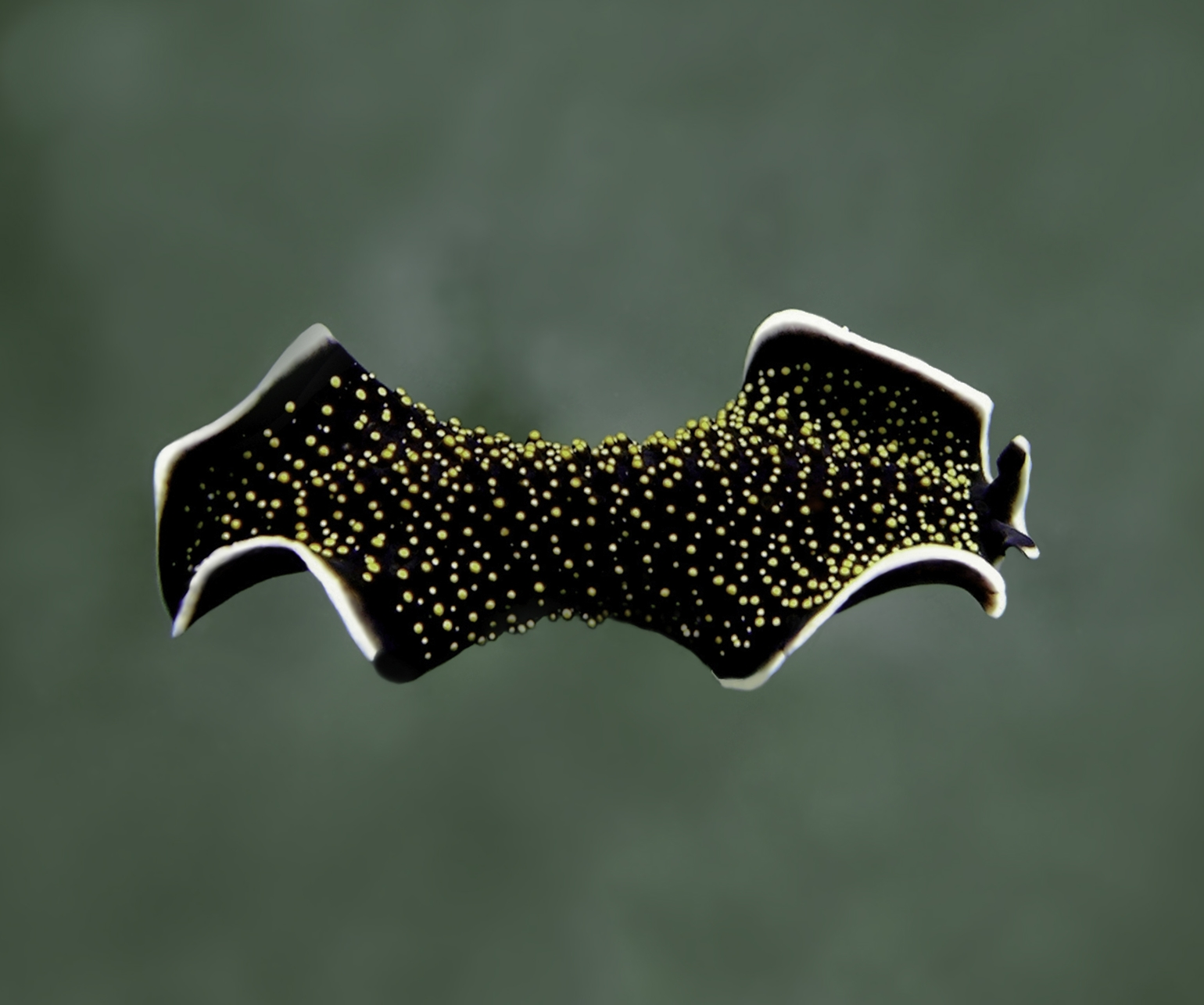
- Thysanozoon nigropapillosum swimming in Manta Ray Bay, Yap

Scientific classification
- Domain: Eukaryota
- Kingdom: Animalia
- Phylum: Platyhelminthes
- Order: Polycladida
- Family: Pseudocerotidae
- Genus: Thysanozoon
- Species: T. nigropapillosum

Binomial name
- Thysanozoon nigropapillosum (Hyman, 1959)

Synonyms
- Acanthozoon nigropapillosum Hyman, 1959

= Thysanozoon nigropapillosum =

Species of flatworm

Thysanozoon nigropapillosum is a species of polyclad flatworms belonging to the family Pseudocerotidae. Some common names include Gold-speckled flatworm, Marine flatworm, Yellow papillae flatworm, Yellow-spotted flatworm, and Yellow-spotted polyclad flatworm.

== Description ==
Thysanozoon nigropapillosum has a long body and broad shape. They grow up to 3 in (76 mm). The dorsal surface is deep black and covered with numerous yellow-tipped papillae varying in size. The ventral surface is dark brown. The outer margin of the body is slightly wavy and bordered in opaque white. They have small, ear-like pseudotentacles in the middle of the anterior end. They swim by propelling themselves through the water with a rhythmic undulating motion of the body.

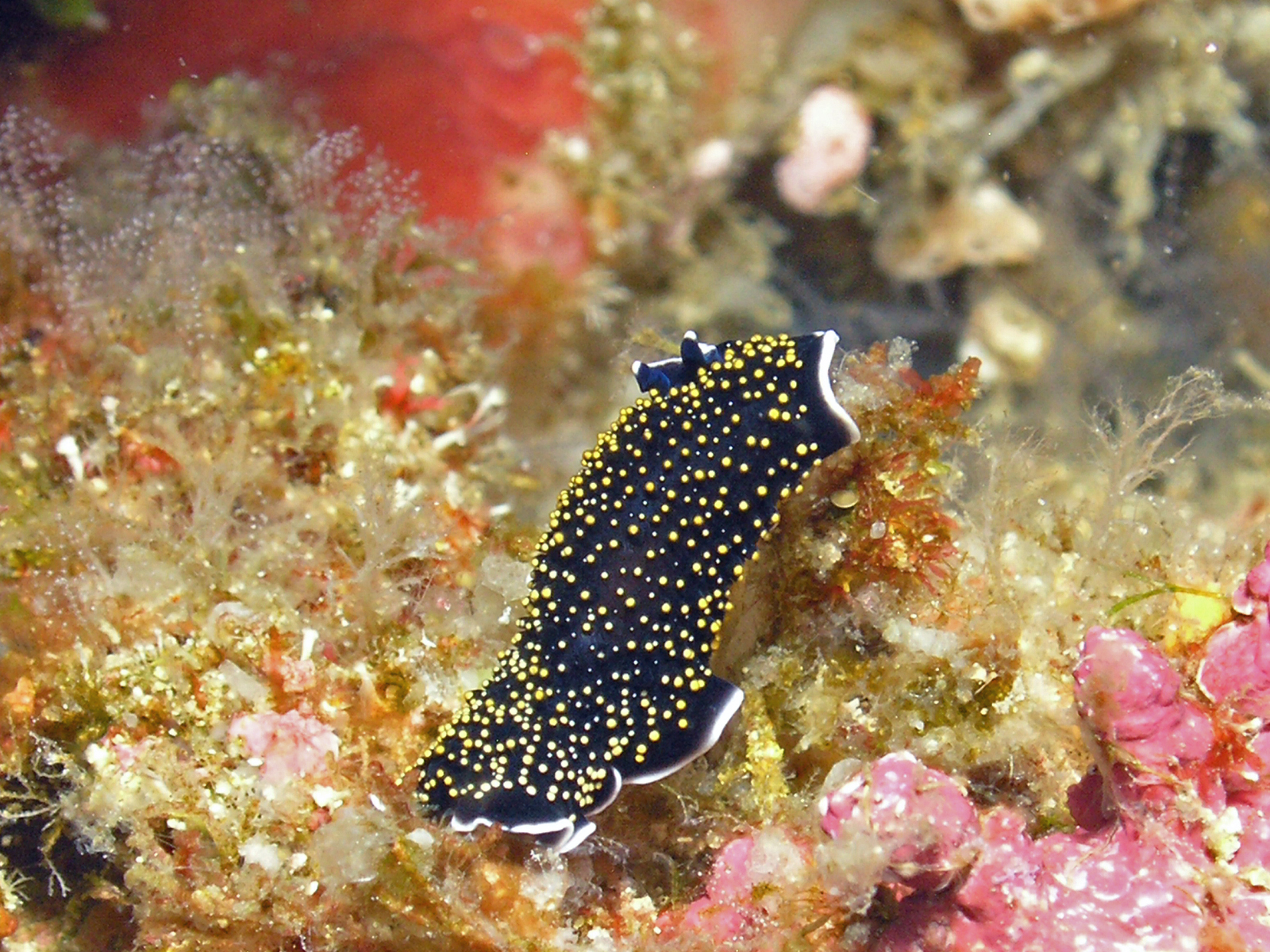

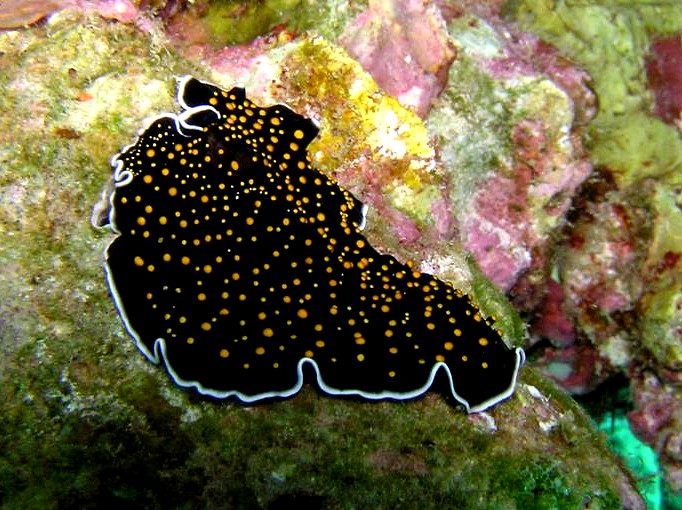

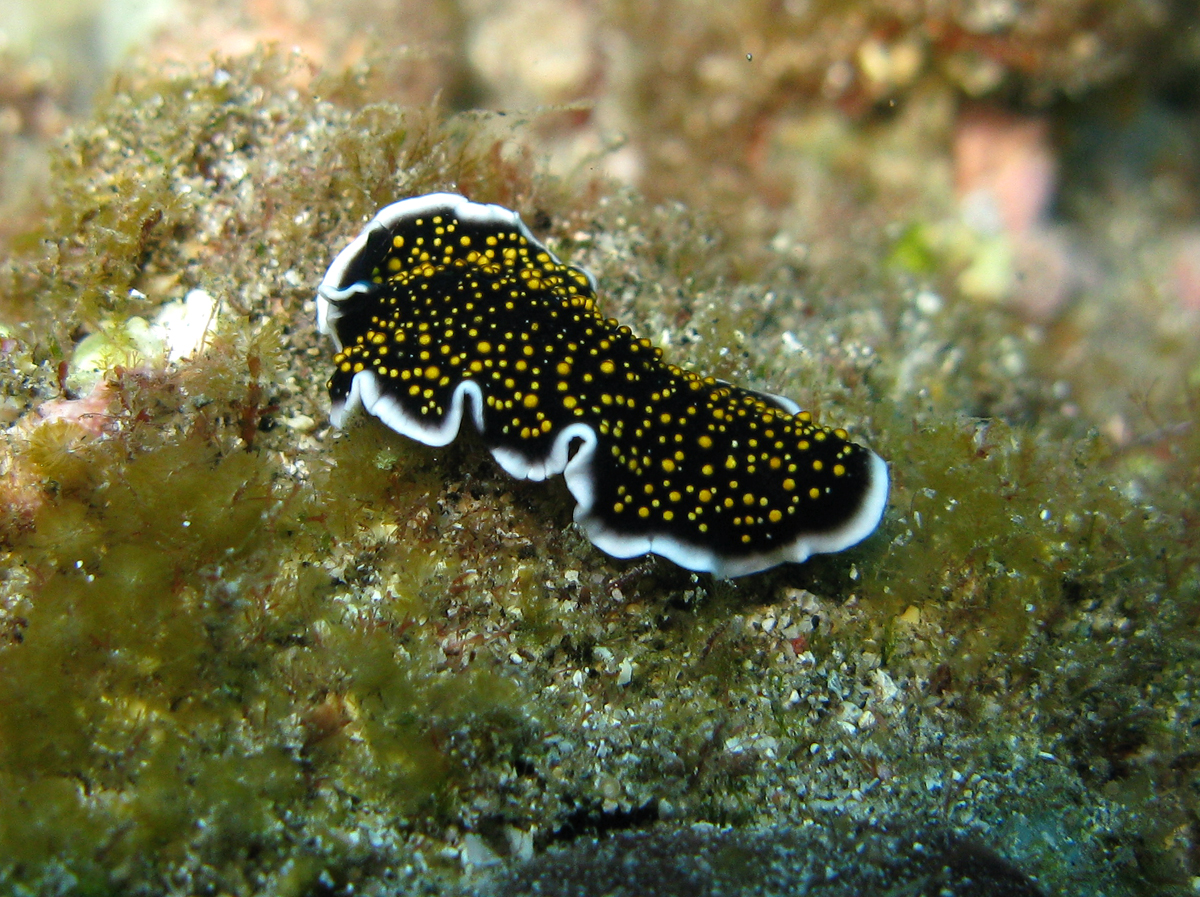

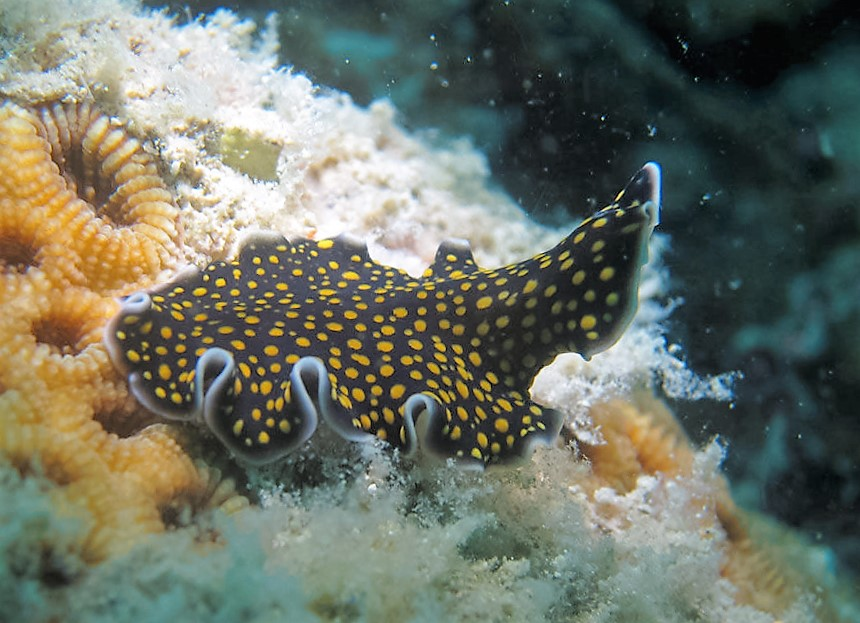

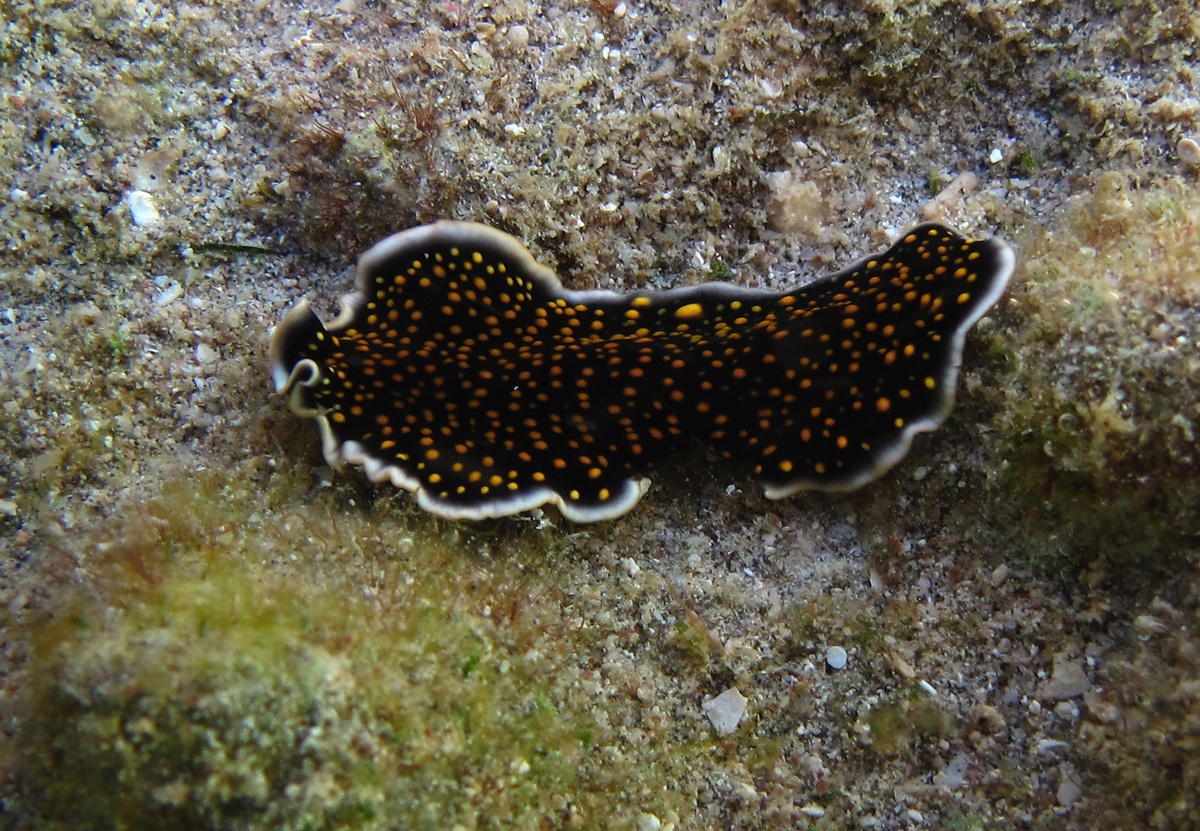

== Distribution ==
This species is widespread in the tropical Indo-Pacific.

== Biology ==
Thysanozoon nigropapillosum is quite common along the external reef in the shallow sub-tidal zone. It can swim by undulating and rhythmically contracting the body margins. It feeds on tunicates, using its mouth and large pharynx to engulf Didemnum spp., and later regurgitates food pellets containing the calcareous spicules present in their tunics. Polyclad flatworms are hermaphrodites, with each one of a pair of flatworms trying to inseminate the other. Transfer of sperm may be by hypodermic insemination, but this is made difficult in this species by the presence of the papillae, and dermal impregnation often occurs. This involves sperm entering the body directly after being placed in the marginal region of the skin. Such dermal insemination is facilitated by the fact that the flatworm has two penises which are strengthened by the presence of rhabdites, and these can grip the margin of the partner and keep hold, even while the recipient is swimming.
