= Coelogynoporidae =

Scientific classification
- Kingdom: Animalia
- Phylum: Platyhelminthes
- Order: Proseriata
- Infraorder: Lithophora
- Family: Coelogynoporidae

Family of flatworms

Coelogynoporidae is a family of flatworms belonging to the order Proseriata.

Ten genera are accepted:

- Carenscoilia Sopott, 1972
- Cirrifera Sopott, 1972
- Coelogynopora Steinböck, 1924
- Ezona Tajika, 1980
- Invenusta Sopott-Ehlers, 1976
- Parainvenusta Curini-Galletti, 2010
- Pseudovannuccia Faubel & Rohde, 1998
- Vannuccia Marcus, 1948
