= Otomesostomatidae =

Scientific classification
- Kingdom: Animalia
- Phylum: Platyhelminthes
- Order: Proseriata
- Infraorder: Lithophora
- Family: Otomesostomatidae

Family of flatworms

Otomesostomatidae is a family of flatworms belonging to the order Proseriata.

Genera:

- Baikalotomesostoma Timoshkin, Lukhnev & Zaytseva, 2010
- Otomesostoma Graff, 1882
