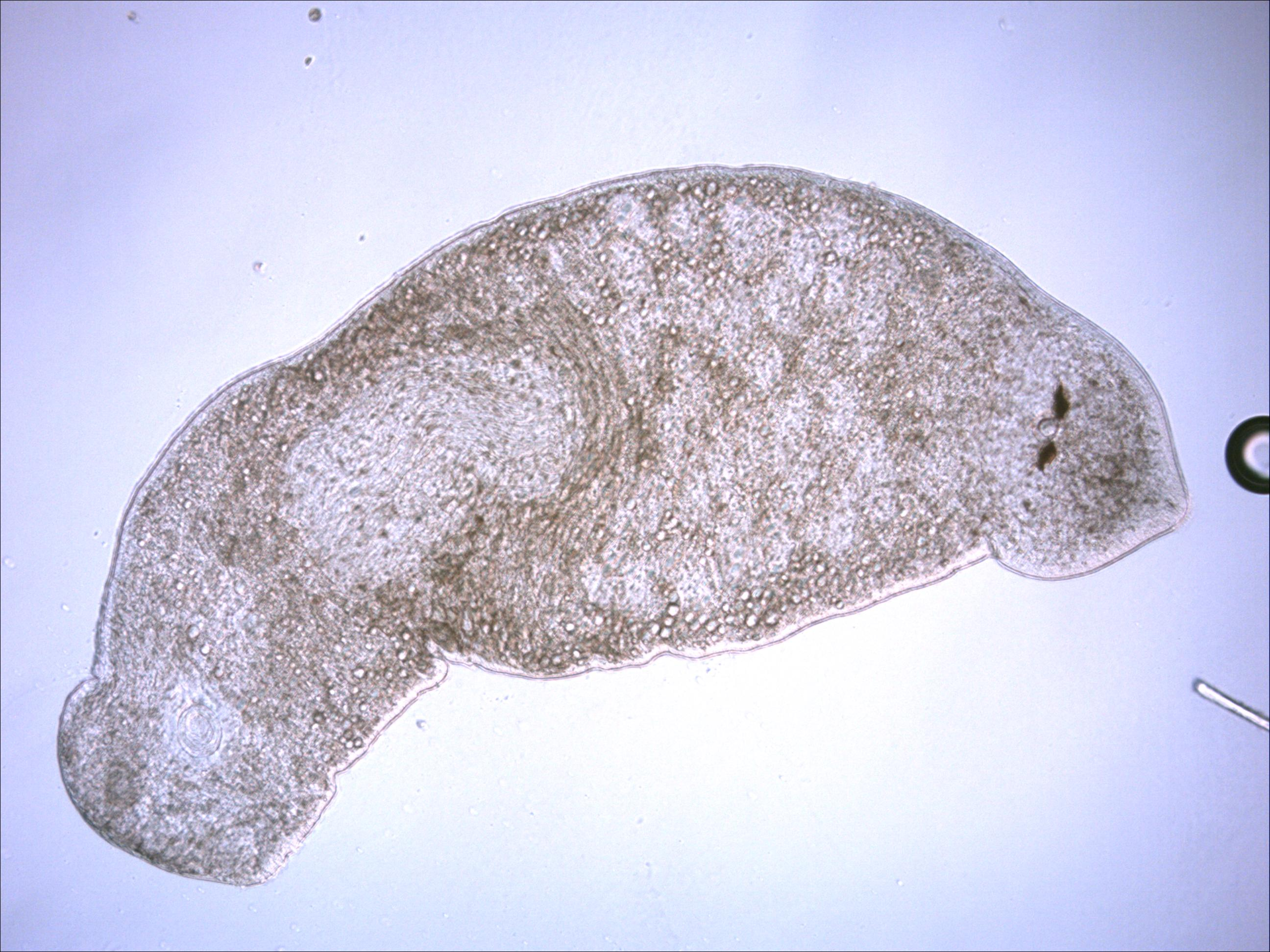
- Monocelis fusca

Scientific classification
- Domain: Eukaryota
- Kingdom: Animalia
- Phylum: Platyhelminthes
- Order: Proseriata
- Infraorder: Lithophora
- Family: Monocelididae; Hofsten, 1907

= Monocelididae =

Family of flatworms

Monocelididae is family of marine turbellarian flatworms in the order Proseriata, sub order Lithophora.

== Genera ==
- Archiloinae Faubel & Rohde, 1998
  - Archilina Ax, 1959
  - Archiloa de Beauchamp, 1910
  - Archilopsis Meixner, 1938
  - Inaloa Martens & Curini-Galletti, 1994
  - Mesoda Marcus, 1949
  - Monocelopsis Ax, 1951
  - Tajikina Martens & Curini-Galletti, 1994
- Cannoninae Faubel & Rohde, 1998
  - Acanthopseudomonocelis Curini-Galletti & Cannon, 1995
  - Cannona Faubel & Rohde, 1998
  - Pseudomonocelis Meixner, 1943
- Globuliphorinae Westblad, 1952
  - Globuliphora Westblad, 1952
- Minoninae Karling, 1978
  - Duplominona Karling, 1966
  - Duploperaclistus Martens, 1983
  - Ectocotyla Hyman, 1944
  - Minona Marcus, 1946
  - Peraclistus Steinböck, 1932
  - Preminona Karling, 1966
  - Pseudominona Karling, 1978
- Monocelidinae Midelburg, 1908
  - Boreocelis Westblad, 1952
  - Digenobothrium Palombi, 1926
  - Heteromonocelis Miller & Faubel, 2003
  - Monocelis Ehrenberg, 1831
  - Myrmeciplana Graff, 1911
  - Necia Marcus, 1950
  - Paramonotus Meixner, 1938
  - Sabazius Marcus, 1954
- Promonotinae Marcus, 1949
  - Promonotus Beklemischev, 1927
