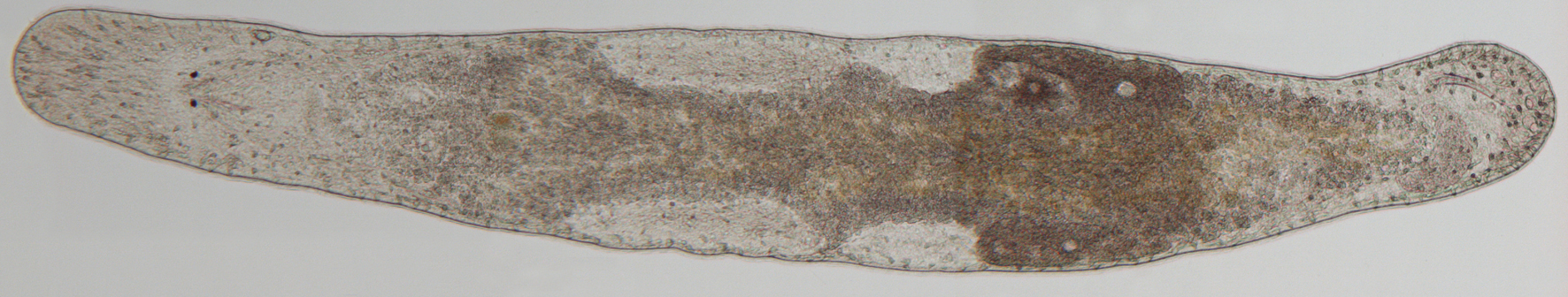
- Macrostomum lignano

Scientific classification
- Kingdom: Animalia
- Phylum: Platyhelminthes
- Family: Macrostomidae
- Genus: Macrostomum; Schmidt, 1848

= Macrostomum =

Macrostomum Temporal range: No fossils known

Genus of flatworms

Macrostomum is a genus of flatworm with a worldwide distribution, with over a hundred species described to date. These hermaphroditic, free-living flatworms are usually small in size, with large species reaching up to 5 mm in body length (e.g. Macrostomum tuba). They are usually transparent, and the smaller species appear rather round in cross-section than dorsoventrally flattened.

== Name ==
The term "Macrostomum", meaning "big-mouthed", derives from the Greek μάκρος makros, "large", and στόμα, stoma, mouth. Relative to other turbellaria, Macrostomum species have indeed a long mouth, connected to the gut by a muscular pharynx which can expand, in certain species, to almost the width of the animal.

== Ecology ==
Macrostomum species inhabit different aquatic or moist environments. Marine and brackish species are often interstitial (living in the space between grains of sediment), whereas freshwater species are also frequently found associated with aquatic plants. Many of these small worms feed on unicellular algae such as diatoms, others on zooplankton or smaller benthic invertebrates.

== Species ==
This genus includes Macrostomum lignano, a new model organism for studies on different areas of biology, including development, bioadhesion, regeneration, stem cell biology, ageing, toxicology, genomics, and evolution.

The following species are recognised in the genus Macrostomum:

- Macrostomum acus Wang, 2005
- Macrostomum acutum Ax, 2008
- Macrostomum aegyptium Beltagi, 1972
- Macrostomum amaniense Young, 1976
- Macrostomum amurense Beklemischev, 1950
- Macrostomum appendiculatum Fabricius, 1826
- Macrostomum astericis Schmidt & Sopott-Ehlers, 1976
- Macrostomum auriculatum Nasonov, 1935
- Macrostomum australiense Faubel, Blome & Cannon, 1994
- Macrostomum axi Papi, 1959
- Macrostomum balticum Luther, 1947
- Macrostomum baoanensis Wang & Fang, 2016
- Macrostomum baringoense Young, 1976
- Macrostomum bellebaruchae Ax, 2008
- Macrostomum bicaudatum Wang, Sun & Zhang, 2015
- Macrostomum bicurvistyla Armonies & Hellwig, 1987
- Macrostomum boreale Riedel, 1932
- Macrostomum brandi Wang & Shi, 2022
- Macrostomum brevituba Armonies & Hellwig, 1987
- Macrostomum burti Ax & Armonies, 1987
- Macrostomum cairoense Beltagi, 1972
- Macrostomum calcaris Ax, 2008
- Macrostomum caprariae Papi, 1959
- Macrostomum carolinense (Ferguson, 1940)
- Macrostomum catarractae Gieysztor, 1938
- Macrostomum ceylanicum Schmarda, 1859
- Macrostomum chongqingensis Lin & Wang, 2017
- Macrostomum christinae Young, 1976
- Macrostomum clavistylum Beklemischev, 1951
- Macrostomum clavituba Ax, 2008
- Macrostomum cliftonensis Schärer & Brand, 2019
- Macrostomum collistylum Ferguson, 1939
- Macrostomum contortum Beklemischev, 1951
- Macrostomum coomerensis Faubel & Cameron, 2001
- Macrostomum coxi Young, 1976
- Macrostomum crassum Brand, 2023
- Macrostomum curvata (Papi, 1951)
- Macrostomum curvistylum Ferguson, 1939
- Macrostomum curvituba Luther, 1947
- Macrostomum delphax Marcus, 1946
- Macrostomum deltanensis Beltagi & El Said, 2002
- Macrostomum distinguendum Papi, 1951
- Macrostomum dongyuanensis Wang & Sun, 2015
- Macrostomum dorsiforum Beltagi, 1972
- Macrostomum elgonense (de Beauchamp, 1935)
- Macrostomum ensiferum Beklemischev, 1951
- Macrostomum ermini Ax, 1959
- Macrostomum evelinae Marcus, 1946
- Macrostomum extraculum Ax & Armonies, 1990
- Macrostomum fergussoni Beklemischev, 1951
- Macrostomum finnlandense (Ferguson, 1940)
- Macrostomum flexum Ax, 2008
- Macrostomum frigorophilum (Ferguson, 1940)
- Macrostomum gallicum Ax, 2008
- Macrostomum galloprovinciale Schmidt & Sopott-Ehlers, 1976
- Macrostomum georgeense Young, 1976
- Macrostomum gilberti Ferguson, 1939
- Macrostomum glochistylum Ferguson, 1939
- Macrostomum goharii Beltagi, Ibrahim & Moustafa, 2000
- Macrostomum gracile Pereyaslawzewa, 1892
- Macrostomum gracilistylum Brand, 2023
- Macrostomum graffi Ferguson, 1939
- Macrostomum granulophorum (Ferguson, 1940)
- Macrostomum greenwoodi Faubel & Cameron, 2001
- Macrostomum guttulatum Ax, 2008
- Macrostomum hamatum Luther, 1947
- Macrostomum heyuanensis Wang & Sun, 2015
- Macrostomum hofsteni Rogozin, 2012
- Macrostomum hystricinum Beklemischev, 1951
- Macrostomum hystrix Ørsted, 1843
- Macrostomum ideficis Schmidt & Sopott-Ehlers, 1976
- Macrostomum incurvatum Ax, 2008
- Macrostomum inductum Kolasa, 1971
- Macrostomum inflatum Beklemischev, 1951
- Macrostomum infundibuliferum Plotnikow, 1905
- Macrostomum intermedium Tu, 1934
- Macrostomum ismailiensis Beltagi, Ibrahim & Moustafa, 2001
- Macrostomum janickei Schärer, 2019
- Macrostomum japonicum Okugawa, 1930
- Macrostomum johni Young, 1972
- Macrostomum karlingi Papi, 1953
- Macrostomum kepneri (Ferguson & Jones, 1940)
- Macrostomum korsakovi Nasonov, 1921
- Macrostomum lankouensis Lin & Wang, 2017
- Macrostomum leptos An der Lan, 1939
- Macrostomum lewisi Ferguson, 1939
- Macrostomum lignano Ladurner, Schärer, Salvenmoser & Rieger, 2005
- Macrostomum lineare Uljanin, 1870
- Macrostomum littorale Wang & Shi, 2022
- Macrostomum longispermatum Brand, 2023
- Macrostomum longistyliferum Ax, 1956
- Macrostomum longituba Papi, 1953
- Macrostomum lutheri Beklemischev, 1927
- Macrostomum magnacurvituba Ax, 1994
- Macrostomum majesticis Schmidt & Sopott-Ehlers, 1976
- Macrostomum mediterraneum Ax, 1956
- Macrostomum megalogastricum Pereyaslawzewa, 1892
- Macrostomum minutum (Luther, 1947)
- Macrostomum mirumnovem Schärer & Brand, 2019
- Macrostomum mosquense Beklemischev, 1951
- Macrostomum mystrophorum Meixner, 1926
- Macrostomum nairobiense Young, 1976
- Macrostomum nassonovi (Nasonov, 1921)
- Macrostomum niloticum Beltagi, 1972
- Macrostomum norfolkensis Jones & Ferguson, 1940
- Macrostomum obelicis Schmidt & Sopott-Ehlers, 1976
- Macrostomum obtusa Wang, 2005
- Macrostomum obtusum Vejdovsky, 1895
- Macrostomum ontarioense Ferguson, 1942
- Macrostomum orthostylum Braun, 1885
- Macrostomum parmum Ball, 1977
- Macrostomum pellitum Brand, 2023
- Macrostomum phillipsi Ferguson & Stirewalt, 1938
- Macrostomum phocurum Marcus, 1954
- Macrostomum pithecusae Papi, 1959
- Macrostomum platensis Adami, Damborenea & Ronderos, 2012
- Macrostomum poznaniense Kolasa, 1973
- Macrostomum prognosticis Schmidt & Sopott-Ehlers, 1976
- Macrostomum pseudoobscurum Beklemischev, 1927
- Macrostomum pseudosinense Wang & Zhang, 2021
- Macrostomum puntapiedrensis Brusa, 2006
- Macrostomum purpureum Reisinger & Kelbetz, 1964
- Macrostomum qiaochengensis Wang & Fang, 2017
- Macrostomum quiritium Beklemischev, 1951
- Macrostomum rectum Ax, 2008
- Macrostomum recurvostylum (Ferguson, 1940)
- Macrostomum retortum Papi, 1951
- Macrostomum reynoldsi Ferguson, 1939
- Macrostomum reynoldsoni Young, 1976
- Macrostomum rhabdophorum Beklemischev, 1927
- Macrostomum riedeli Ferguson, 1939
- Macrostomum romanicum Mack-Fira, 1968
- Macrostomum rostratum Papi, 1959
- Macrostomum ruebushi Ferguson, 1940
- Macrostomum saifunicum Nasonov, 1929
- Macrostomum salemensis Beltagi & El-Said, 2003
- Macrostomum schareri Brand, 2023
- Macrostomum schmitti Hayes & Ferguson, 1940
- Macrostomum semicirculatum Ax, 2008
- Macrostomum sensitivum Silliman, 1884
- Macrostomum shekouense Wang & Shi, 2022
- Macrostomum shenandoahense (Ferguson, 1940)
- Macrostomum shenzhenensis Wang & Wang, 2017
- Macrostomum shiyanensis Lin & Wang, 2017
- Macrostomum silesiacum Kolasa, 1973
- Macrostomum sinensis Wang, 2005
- Macrostomum sinyaense Young, 1976
- Macrostomum spirale Ax, 1956
- Macrostomum stepposus Rogozin, 2012
- Macrostomum stylopensillum Jones, 1939
- Macrostomum subterraneum Rixen, 1961
- Macrostomum taurinum Wang & Zhang, 2021
- Macrostomum tennesseense Ferguson, 1939
- Macrostomum tenuicauda Luther, 1947
- Macrostomum thermale Reisinger, 1933
- Macrostomum thingithuense Young, 1976
- Macrostomum timavi Graff, 1905
- Macrostomum troubadicus Schmidt & Sopott-Ehlers, 1976
- Macrostomum truncatum (Ferguson, 1940)
- Macrostomum tuba Graff, 1882
- Macrostomum uncinatum Ax, 2008
- Macrostomum vejdovskyi Ferguson & Jones, 1940
- Macrostomum velastylum Brusa, 2006
- Macrostomum virginianum Ferguson, 1937
- Macrostomum viride Beneden E., 1870
- Macrostomum xiamensis Wang & Luo, 2004
- Macrostomum zhaoqingensis Lin & Wang, 2017
- Macrostomum zhujiangensis Wang & Fang, 2016
