= Cathetocephalidea =

Scientific classification
- Domain: Eukaryota
- Kingdom: Animalia
- Phylum: Platyhelminthes
- Class: Cestoda
- Order: Cathetocephalidea

Order of flatworms

Cathetocephalidea is an order of flatworms belonging to the class Cestoda.

Families:

- Cathetocephalidae
- Disculicepitidae
