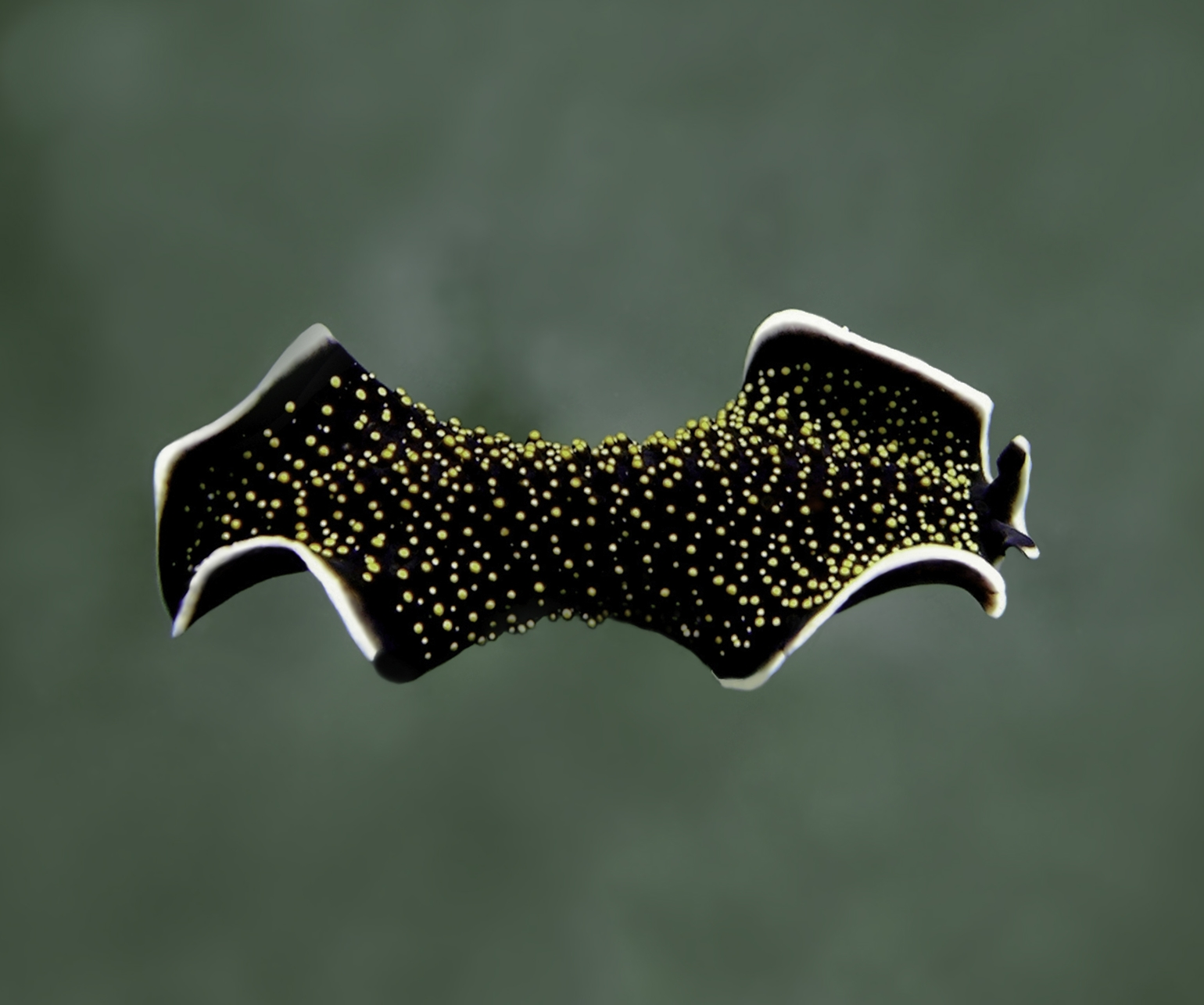
- Yellow papillae flatworm (Thysanozoon nigropapillosum), Manta Ray Bay, Yap.

Scientific classification
- Domain: Eukaryota
- Kingdom: Animalia
- Phylum: Platyhelminthes
- Order: Polycladida
- Suborder: Cotylea
- Family: Pseudocerotidae
- Genus: Thysanozoon; Grube, 1840

= Thysanozoon =

Genus of flatworms

Thysanozoon is a genus of polyclad flatworms belonging to the family Pseudocerotidae.

== Species ==
- Thysanozoon alagoensis Bahia, Padula, Correia & Sovierzoski, 2015
- Thysanozoon aucklandicum Cheeseman, 1883
- Thysanozoon australe Stimpson, 1855
- Thysanozoon brocchii (Risso, 1818)
- Thysanozoon californicum Hyman, 1953
- Thysanozoon cruciatum Schmarda, 1859
- Thysanozoon discoideum Schmarda, 1859
- Thysanozoon distinctum Stummer-Traunfels, 1895
- Thysanozoon estacahuitensis Ramos-Sanchez, Bahia & Rolando Bastida-Zavala, 2020
- Thysanozoon flavotuberculatum Hyman, 1939
- Thysanozoon griseum Verrill, 1901
- Thysanozoon hawaiiensis Hyman, 1960
- Thysanozoon huttoni Kirk, 1882
- Thysanozoon japonicum Kato, 1944
- Thysanozoon langi Stummer-Traunfels, 1895
- Thysanozoon minutum Stummer-Traunfels, 1895
- Thysanozoon mirtae Bulnes, Albano, Obenat & Cazzaniga, 2011
- Thysanozoon nigropapillosum (Hyman, 1959)
- Thysanozoon nigrum Girard, 1851
- Thysanozoon papillosum Grube, 1840
- Thysanozoon raphaeli Bolanos, Quiroga & Litvaitis, 2007
- Thysanozoon sandiegiense Hyman, 1953
- Thysanozoon skottsburgi Bock, 1923
- Thysanozoon tentaculatum (Gray in Pease, 1860)
- Thysanozoon verrucosum Grube, 1867
- Thysanozoon vulgare Palombi, 1939
