= Disculicepitidae =

Scientific classification
- Kingdom: Animalia
- Phylum: Platyhelminthes
- Class: Cestoda
- Family: Disculicepitidae

Synonyms
- Disculicipitidae

Family of worms

Disculicepitidae is a family of flatworms belonging to the order Cathetocephalidea. The family consists of only one genus: Disculiceps Joyeux & Baer, 1936.
