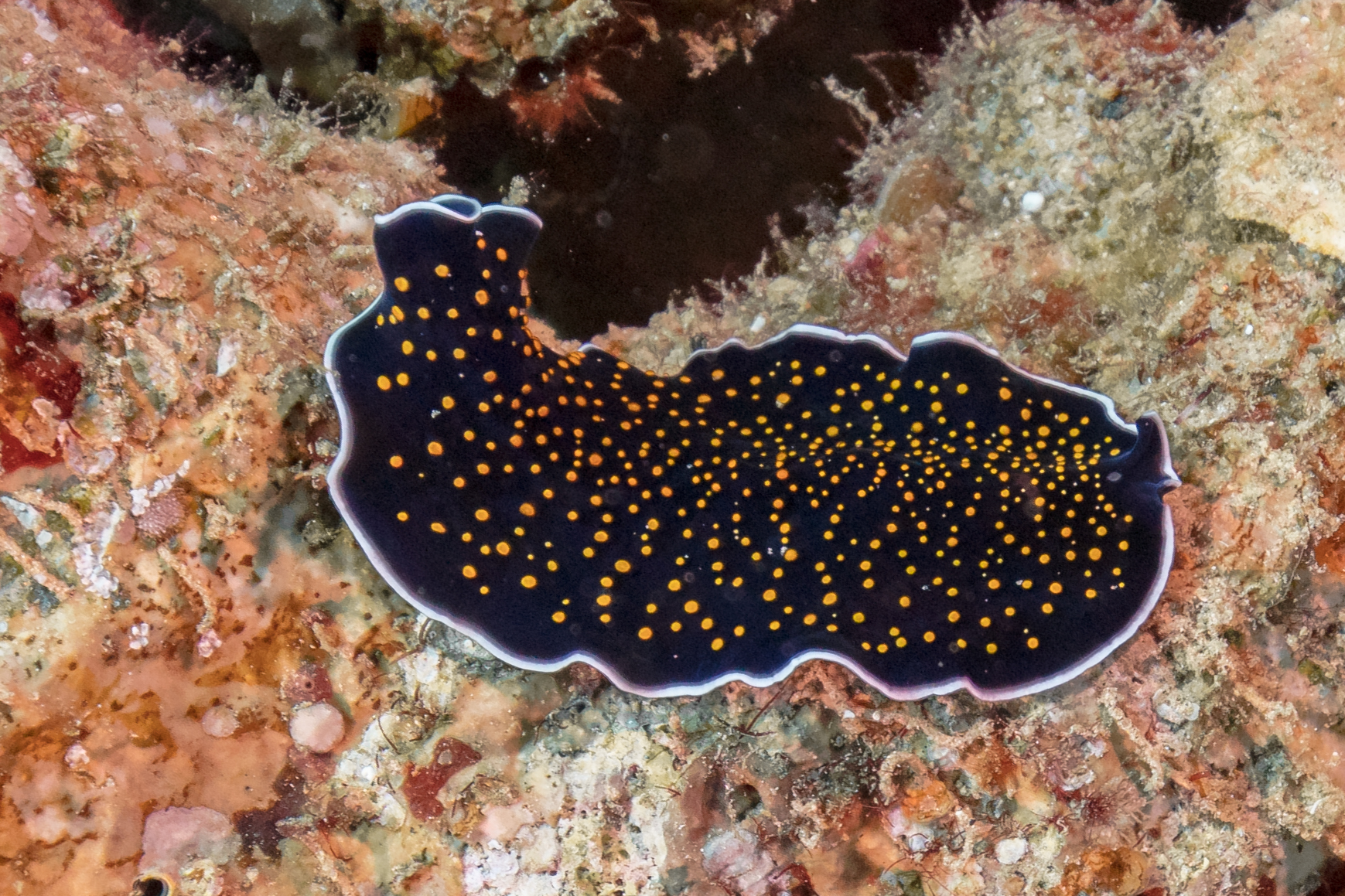
- Thysanozoon flavotuberculatum in Ras Muhammad National Park, Egypt

Scientific classification
- Kingdom: Animalia
- Phylum: Platyhelminthes
- Order: Polycladida
- Suborder: Cotylea
- Family: Pseudocerotidae
- Genus: Thysanozoon
- Species: T. flavotuberculatum

Binomial name
- Thysanozoon flavotuberculatum (Hyamn, 1939)

= Thysanozoon flavotuberculatum =

Species of flatworm

Thysanozoon flavotuberculatum (also called the yellow spot flatworm) is a species of flatworm of the genus Thysanozoon, that was first described in 1939. T. flavotuberculatum is greyish with scattered black flecks and yellow papillae. It is found in the seas around Australia and Indonesia.
