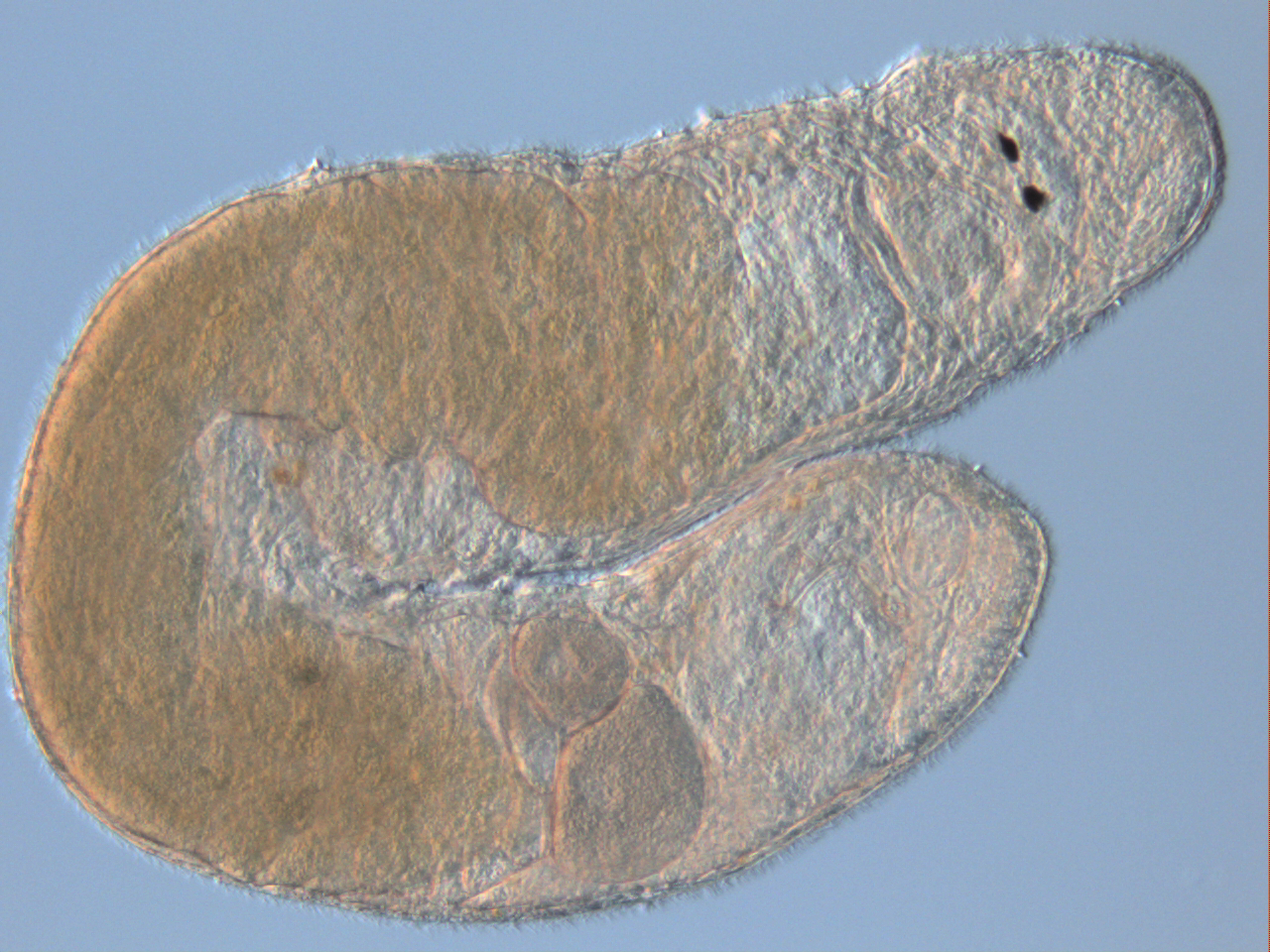
- An adult Dolichomacrostomum uniporum, a member of the Dolichomacrostominae

Scientific classification
- Domain: Eukaryota
- Kingdom: Animalia
- Phylum: Platyhelminthes
- Order: Dolichomicrostomida
- Family: Dolichomacrostomidae

Subtaxa
- Bathymacrostominae; Dolichomacrostominae; Karlingiinae; Myomacrostomum

= Dolichomacrostomidae =

Family of flatworms

Dolichomacrostomidae is a family of small basal free-living flatworms of the clade Macrostomorpha. There are currently about 40 named species in this family.

== Description ==
Members of Dolichomacrostomidae are characterized by the presence of a tubular pharynx directed dorsocaudally and having a gland wreath with rhabdite glands. The brain is perforated by the ducts of the frontal glands, and the copulatory apparatus has a common gonopore for both male and female parts, with the female ducts open rostrally and the male ducts obliquely caudally into the common atrium. The male reproductive system has only one testis, which lies in front or at the same level as the ovaries.

== Ecology and distribution ==
Species of Dolichomacrostomidae are all members of the meiobenthos. Moreover, they are primarily marine, with some forms entering brackish habitats. Many forms are particularly abundant in the subtidal meiobenthos, but there are also intertidal and a few deep-sea forms. They can be found in all major oceans worldwide, but many areas have been very poorly studied.

== Reproduction ==
Like almost all flatworms, species of Dolichomacrostomidae are simultaneous hermaphrodites. They are remarkable for the high complexity of their genitalia. The male copulatory organ often consists of two parts, a glandular and a penis stylet. The former only transfers glandular secretions and the latter both sperm and glandular products. The female copulatory apparatus is often associated with sclerotized valve structures of unknown function.
