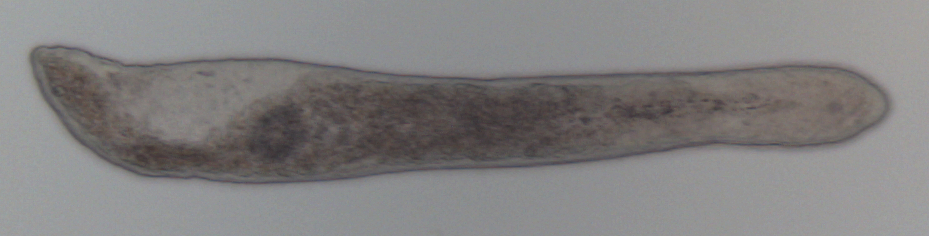
- An adult Microstomum papillosum

Scientific classification
- Domain: Eukaryota
- Kingdom: Animalia
- Phylum: Platyhelminthes
- Order: Macrostomida
- Family: Microstomidae

Genera
- Alaurina; Microstomum; Myozonella

= Microstomidae =

Family of flatworms

The Microstomidae are a family of small basal free-living flatworms (Macrostomida, Rhabditophora, Platyhelminthes), and members of the marine, brackish, freshwater meiobenthos and plankton. There are currently about 40 named species in this family.
