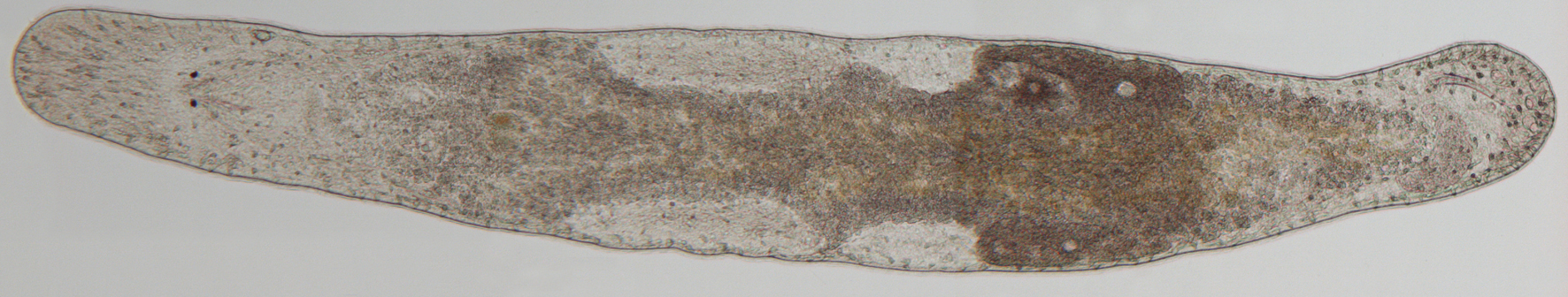

Scientific classification
- Kingdom: Animalia
- Phylum: Platyhelminthes
- Family: Macrostomidae
- Genus: Macrostomum
- Species: M. lignano

Binomial name
- Macrostomum lignano Ladurner, Schärer, Salvenmoser, & Rieger, 2005

= Macrostomum lignano =

Species of flatworm

Macrostomum lignano is a free-living, hermaphroditic flatworm. It is transparent and of small size (adults reaching about 1.7 mm), and is part of the intertidal sand meiofauna of the Adriatic Sea. Originally a model organism for research on developmental biology and the evolution of the bilaterian body plan, it has since expanded to other important fields of research such as sexual selection and sexual conflicts, ageing and the evolution of the bilaterian body plan, ecotoxicology, and, more recently, genomics.

== Name ==
The genus name "Macrostomum", meaning "big-mouthed", derives from the Greek μάκρος makros, "large", and στόμα, stoma, mouth. The species name, lignano, comes from the location where this species has so far been found, the sandy beaches and lagoons at and near Lignano Sabbiadoro, Italy.

== Biology ==
Macrostomum lignano, like all other flatworms, is an unsegmented, soft-bodied bilaterian without body cavity, and no specialized circulatory or respiratory organs. Unlike many other flatworms, its body is not flattened but round in cross section, the diffusion of oxygen and nutrients to the different body parts being possible due to its small size (adults reach about 1.7 mm in length)

Macrostomum lignano is a simultaneous hermaphrodite. Adults (about 12 days after hatching, at 20 °C and ad libitum food) have a pair of ovaries and a pair of testes, and simultaneously produce gametes in both sex functions. Reproduction is by outcrossing, with worms mating reciprocally.

== Ecology and distribution ==
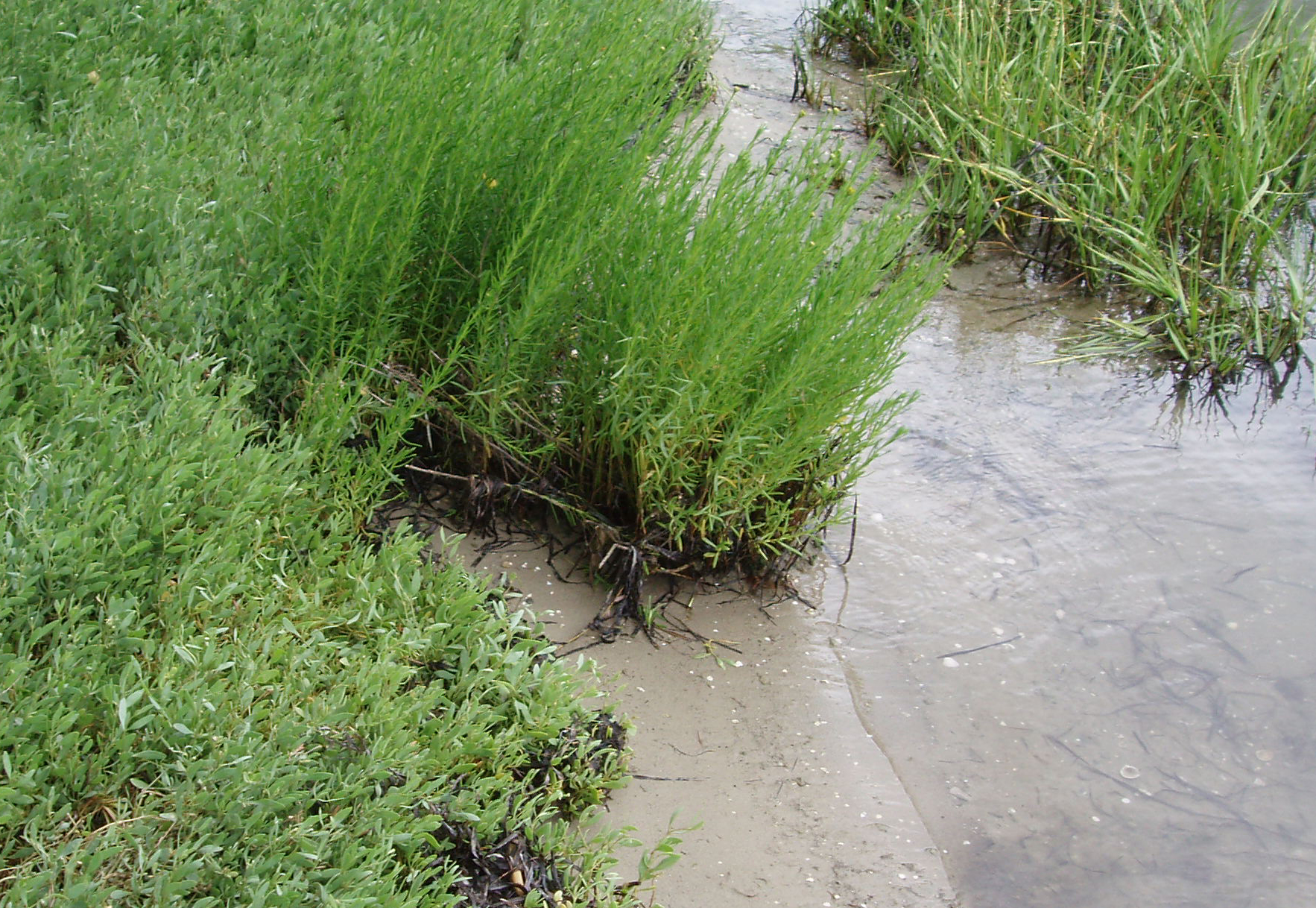
The moist sand above the water mark is excellent M. lignano habitat

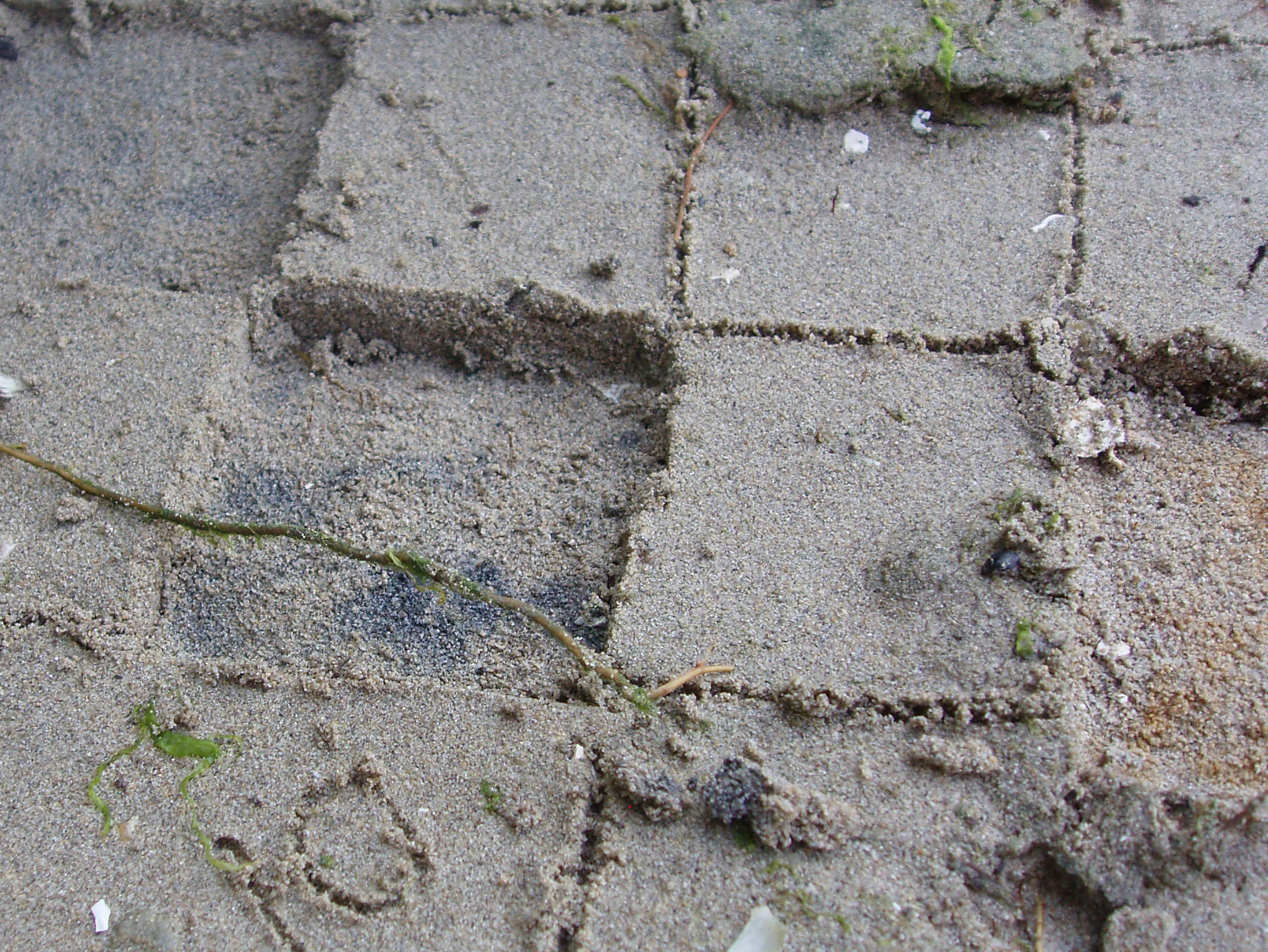
Sampling of moist sand with M. lignano

Macrostomum lignano lives interstitially in sandy habitats, at the intertidal or upper-intertidal zone, usually in the upper 5–10 mm. It only needs a little humidity in the sand to survive, but it can also be found underwater during high tide. It favours protected areas with no or very low wave exposure like tidal lagoons. M. lignano feeds primarily on diatoms, but it has been observed to eat small invertebrates and, occasionally, eggs (even conspecific, and sometimes its own). M. lignano can often be found with other turbellarians, gastrotrichs, nematodes, and numerous groups of crustaceans like copepods.

Density varies widely, there can be hundreds of individuals in a tablespoon of sand. When conditions deteriorate, for instance due to desiccation or increased salinity, M. lignano can encyst by secreting a soft shell which can be dissolved within minutes once conditions improve.

To date, M. lignano has only been found in locations near Lignano Sabbiadoro (Italy): tidal lagoons on the eastern side of Bibione and the Isola di Martignano, natural and semi-natural beaches of the Laguna di Marano and the Isola Valle Vechia.
