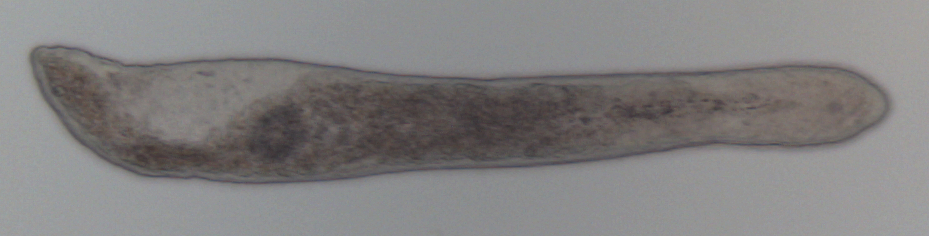
- Microstomum papillosum

Scientific classification
- Kingdom: Animalia
- Phylum: Platyhelminthes
- Subclass: Macrostomorpha
- Order: Dolichomicrostomida; Janssen et al., 2015

Families
- Family Dolichomacrostomidae; Family Microstomidae

= Dolichomicrostomida =

Clade of flatworms

Dolichomicrostomida is a clade of free living flatworms in the group Macrostomorpha. It contains the families Dolichomacrostomidae and Microstomidae. This group is based on molecular studies and no clear synapomorphies are currently known.
