= Lithophora =

Scientific classification
- Kingdom: Animalia
- Phylum: Platyhelminthes
- Order: Proseriata
- Infraorder: Lithophora; Steinbock, 1925

Families
- See text

Infraorder of flatworms

Lithophora is an infraorder of flatworms belonging to the order Proseriata. It contains the following subtaxa:

Families:

- Archimonocelididae Meixner, 1938
- Calviriidae Martens & Curini-Galletti, 1993
- Coelogynoporidae Karling, 1966
- Monocelididae Hofsten, 1907
- Monotoplanidae Ax, 1958
- Otoplanidae Hallez, 1892
- Yorkniidae Curini-Galletti, Scarpa & Casu, 2017

Genera unplaced in families:

- Japanoplana Ax, 1994
- Serrulina Schockaert, Curini-Galletti, De Ridder & Artois, 2011
