= Cathetocephalidae =

Scientific classification
- Kingdom: Animalia
- Phylum: Platyhelminthes
- Class: Cestoda
- Order: Tetraphyllidea
- Family: Cathetocephalidae

Family of flatworms

Cathetocephalidae is a family of flatworms belonging to the order Tetraphyllidea.

Genera:

- Cathetocephalus Dailey & Overstreet, 1973
- Sanguilevator Caira, Mega & Ruhnke, 2005
