= Rhabdite =

Structures in some cells of turbellarians and nemerteans

Rhabdites (from Greek, rhabdos, rod) are rodlike structures in the cells of the epidermis or underlying parenchyma in certain turbellarians, and in the epidermis of nemerteans. They are discharged in mucous secretions. They are a defensive mechanism, which dissolve in water, and they are distasteful to most animals who would prey on rhabditid worms. In nemerteans, rhabdites form mucus on which the animals glide.
