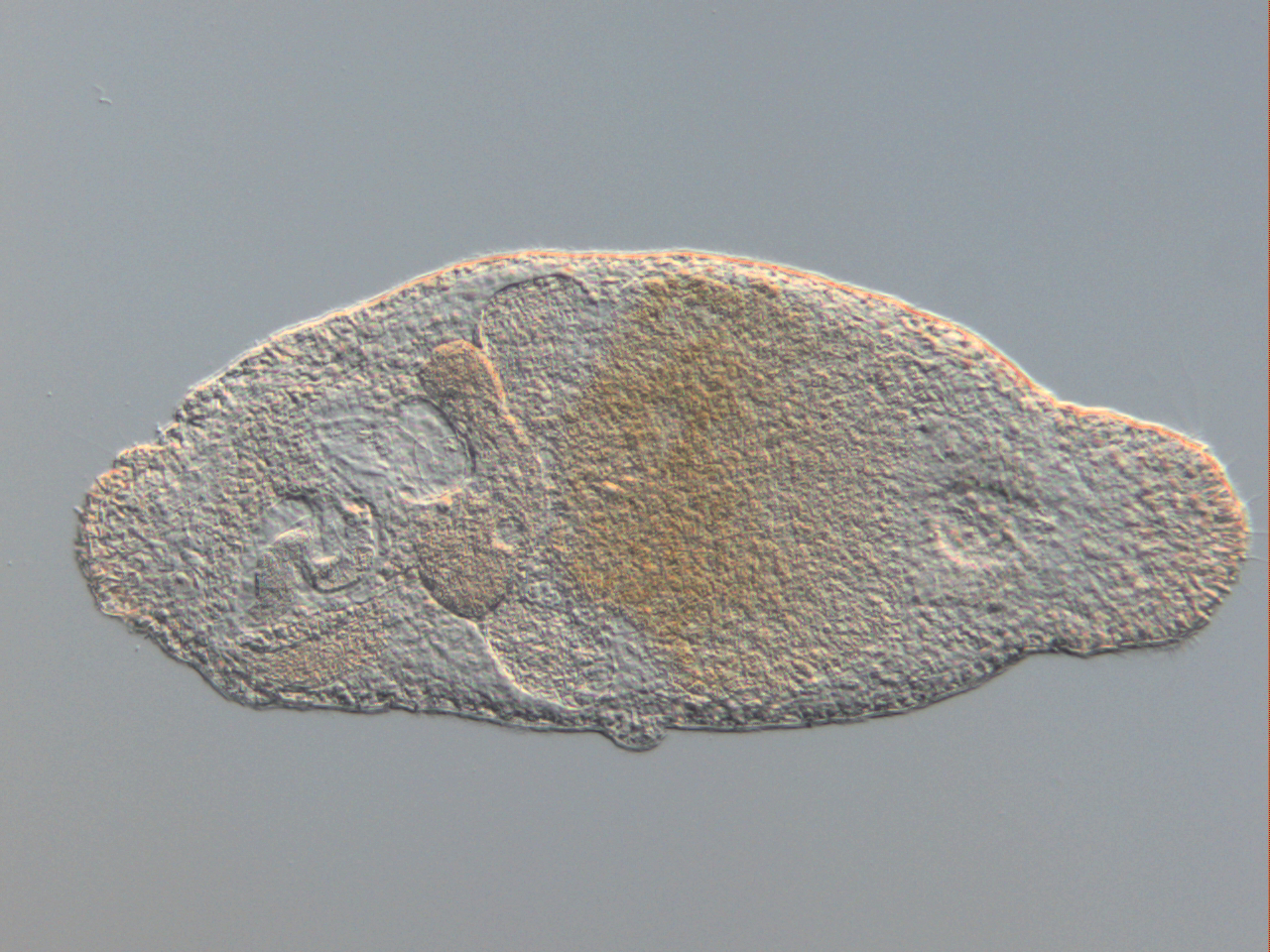
- An adult Antromacrostomum armatum

Scientific classification
- Kingdom: Animalia
- Phylum: Platyhelminthes
- Subclass: Macrostomorpha
- Family: Macrostomidae; Beneden E., 1870

Genera
- Antromacrostomum; Archimacrostomum; Axia; Bradburia; Dunwichia; Macrostomum; Omalostomum; Promacrostomum; Protomacrostomum; Psammomacrostomum; Siccomacrostomum; Unsia

= Macrostomidae =

Family of flatworms

Macrostomidae is a family of small basal free-living flatworms, and are found in marine, brackish, and freshwater environments. There are currently about 180 named species in this family.

== Description ==
Species of the family Macrostomidae are small (~0.5 to 5 mm in length) and generally highly transparent microturbellarians. They are usually round in cross section, and with only the largest forms being dorso-ventrally flattened. They are distinguished from related animals by the possession of a simple pharynx and intestine, a single pair of lateral nerve cords, and by the absence of a statocyst.

== Ecology and distribution ==
Species of the family Macrostomidae are members of a large range of aquatic faunas, ranging from the meiobenthos, epibenthos, to plankton. Moreover, they occur in marine, brackish, and freshwater habitats, and many forms are particularly abundant in the intertidal meiobenthos, where they can be exposed to highly variable environmental conditions. There are also many sub-tidal and a few deep-sea forms. They can be found in all major bodies of water worldwide, and in the freshwater of all continents, except Antarctica.
