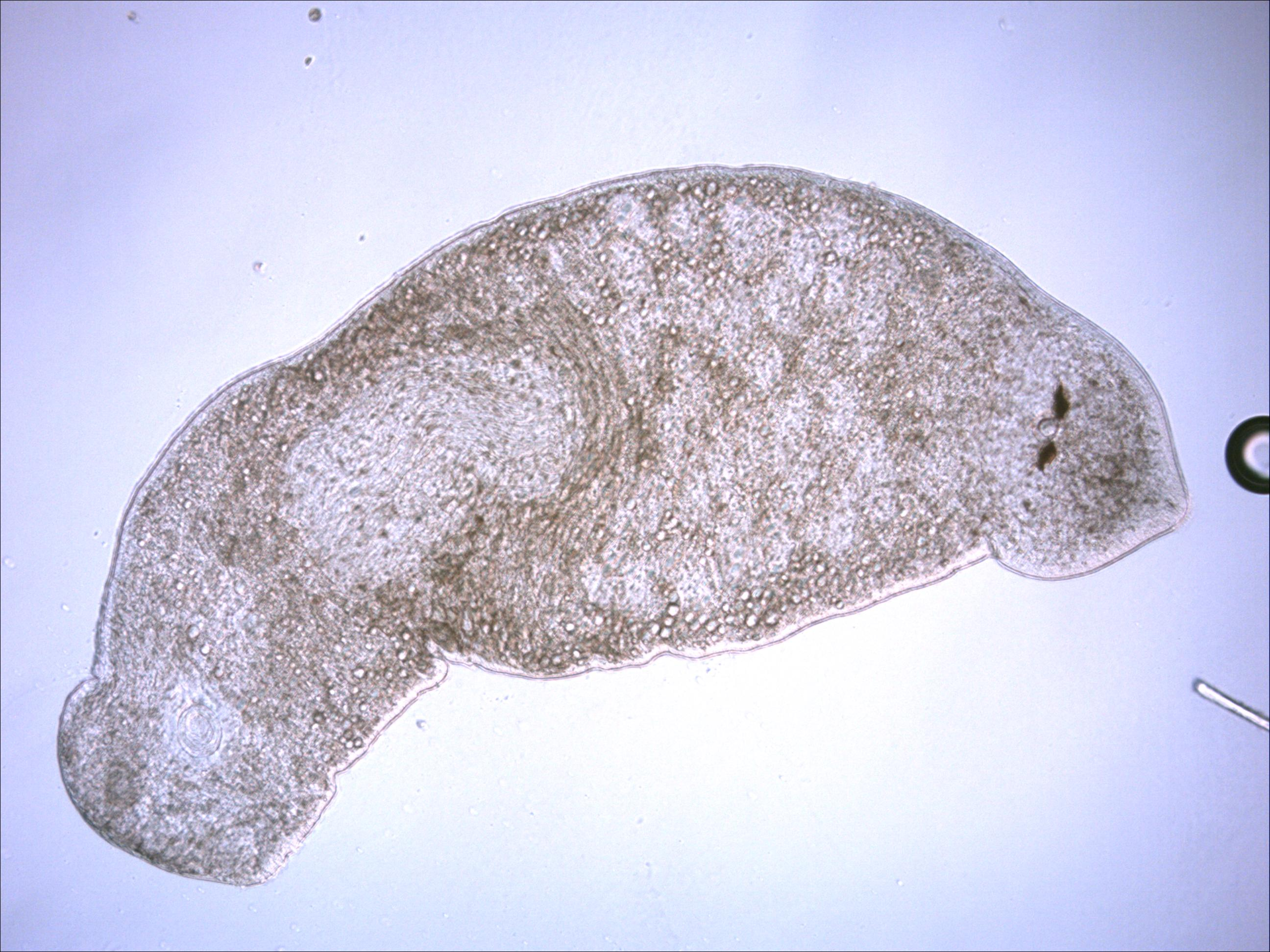
- Monocelis fusca, a proseriate

Scientific classification
- Kingdom: Animalia
- Phylum: Platyhelminthes
- Subphylum: Rhabditophora
- Order: Proseriata; Meixner, 1938

Subdivisionss
- Infraorder Lithophora; Infraorder Unguiphora; Family Ciliopharyngiellidae; Genus Prosogynopora

= Proseriata =

Order of free-living flatworms

Proseriata is an order of free-living flatworms in the class Rhabditophora with over 400 species described worldwide.

== Description ==
Proseriate flatworms are minute aquatic organisms, usually with an elongate body. There are no strong synapomorphies for the group, but it is supported by molecular studies. The suggested synapomorphies include the lack of lamellated rhabdites, an otherwise synapomorphy of Rhabditophora, and some features of the ultrastructure of the protonephridia and the cilia of epidermal cells.

== Ecology ==
Most proseriates occur in marine environments, at the coastal zones, and are particularly common in high-energy habitats with medium to coarse sediments, sometimes being the dominant animal group in such areas. They are also common in brackish water, but few species occur in freshwater.

Most proseriates are carnivores or scavengers, but some species are ectoparasitic on marine crustaceans. As they occur in very high densities in some habitats, they may have a considerable impact on the population of other meiofaunal organisms.
