= Lago di Piediluco =

Lake in Lazio, Italy

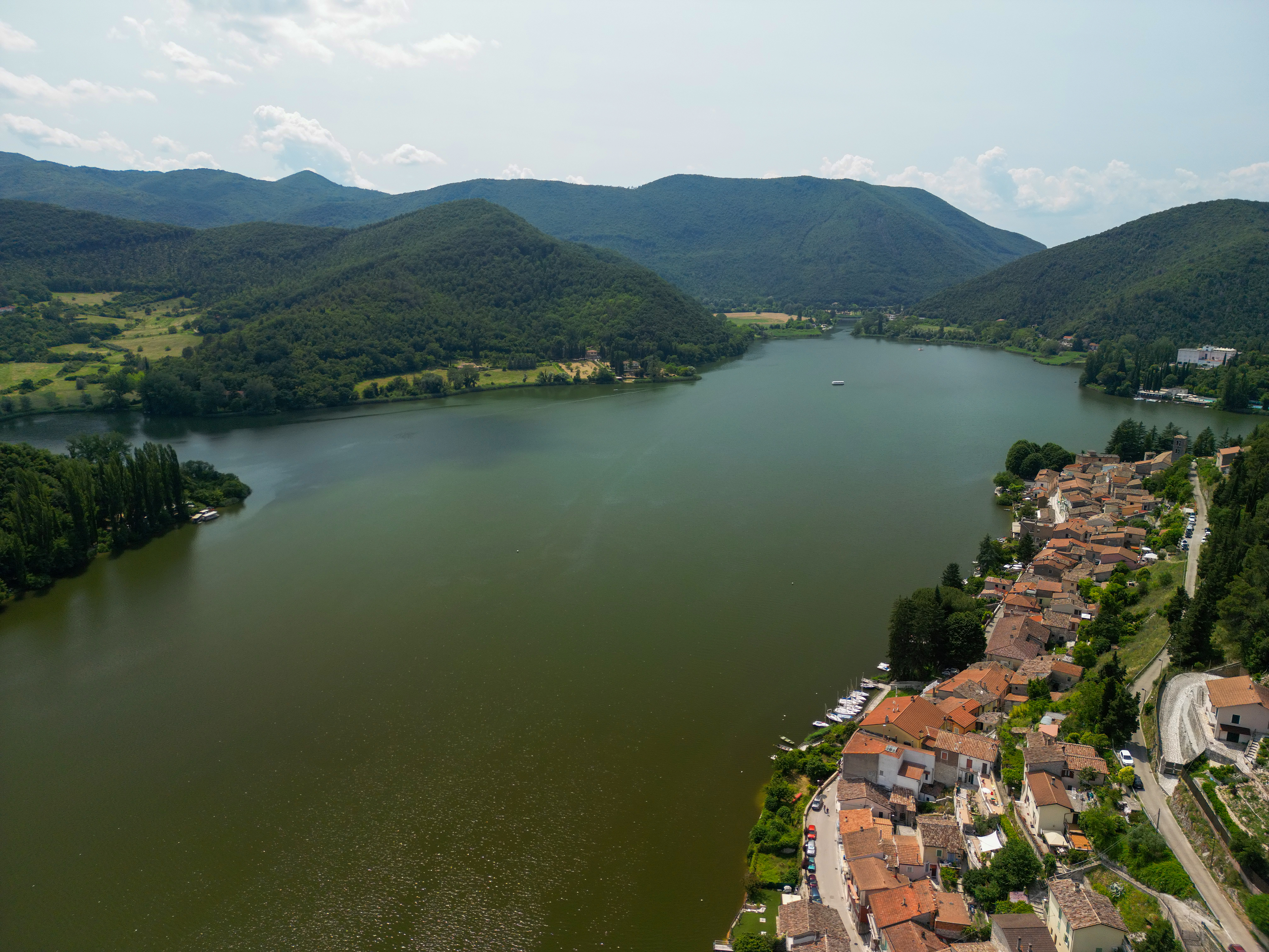
- Panoramic view of the lake

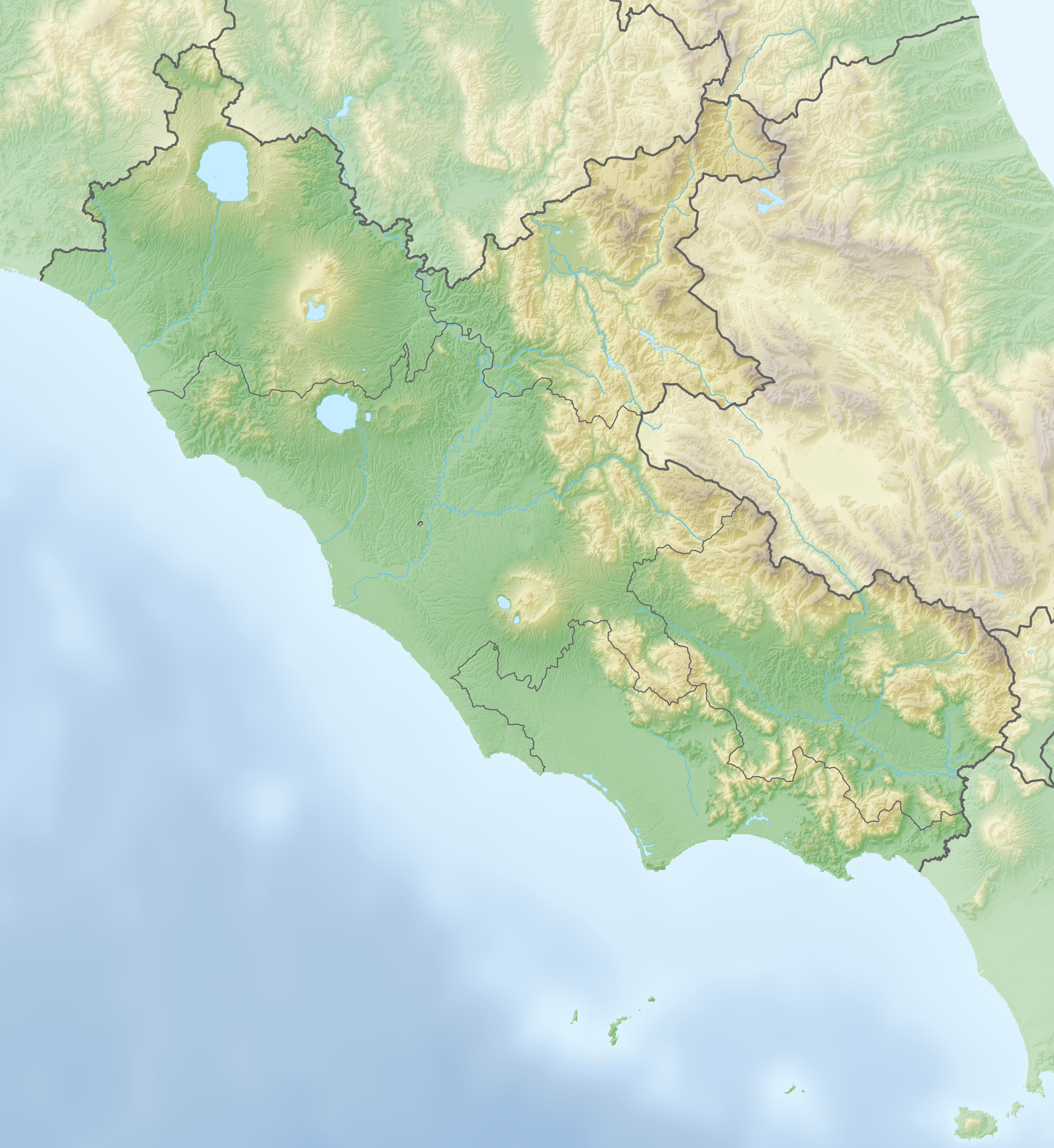
- Location within Lazio
- Location: Province of Rieti, Lazio/Province of Terni, Umbria
- Coordinates: 42°31′N 12°45′E
- Primary inflows: Rio Fuscello; Nera River; Velino River
- Primary outflows: Waterfall Cascata delle Marmore
- Catchment area: 73 km^{2} (28 sq mi)
- Basin countries: Italy
- Max. length: 4.1 km (2.5 mi)
- Max. width: 0.52 km (0.32 mi)
- Surface area: 1.58 km^{2} (0.61 sq mi)
- Max. depth: 19.5 m (64 ft)
- Water volume: 0.017 km^{3} (14,000 acre⋅ft)
- Surface elevation: 375 m (1,230 ft)

Lago di Piediluco (English: Lake Piediluco) is a freshwater lake that straddles the border between the regions of Umbria and Lazio in Italy. At an elevation of about 370 m (1,210 ft), its surface area varies but is between 1.58 km^{2} (0.61 sq mi) and 1.67 km^{2} (0.64 sq mi) with a perimeter of about 15 km (9.3 mi); it has a typical depth of about 10 m (33 ft) and max depth of nearly 20 m (66 ft). The lake receives an inflow of water from three sources: the Rio Fuscello, the Velino river, and the Nera river via the Medio-Nera channel; The flow from the Rio Fuscello is naturally occurring, while the flows from the Nera and Velino rivers are influenced by a series of gates. A partial diversion of the Nera via an aqueduct and canal built in 1932 helps promote the circulation of water throughout the lake, making the Nera the lake's main tributary. A canal approximately 400 metres (1,300 ft) long was built in the 1920s to divert the Velino river from its existing natural course into the lake, with a mobile dam controlling whether the river inflows or outflows. The purpose of this work was to improve hydroelectric power production for the Galleto hydroelectric power station.

== History ==
The lake used to be part of a much larger lake, known during Roman times as Lacus Velinus. Lake Piediluco was formed as a result of cuts downstream from the lake that drained the waters of Lake Velino into the lower Nera River, which also created the Cascata delle Marmore waterfall.

== Sports ==
Lake Piediluco is the site of the Italian National Rowing Center, which hosts many training and competition events at the national, European, and international levels. The lake is ideal for the sport due to its relatively calm winds and water.

== Wildlife ==
Various fish species are present within the lake, including native and exotic species, such as Anguilla anguilla, Coregonus lavaretus, Cyprinus carpio, Esox lucius, Perca fluviatilus, Salmo trutta, Tinca tinca, Esox cisalpinus, Scardinius erythrophthalmus, Gymnocephalus cernua, Rutilus rutilus, Scardinius hesperidicus, Leucos aula, Alburnus alborella, Abramis brama, Carassius auratus, Lepomis gibbosus, and Squalius squalus.

Multiple Acanthocephala also act as a parasite for fishes in the lake, including Acanthocephalus lucii, Acanthocephalus rhinensis, Dentitruncus truttae, and Echinorhynchus truttae, along with a single species of amphipod, Echinogammarus tibaldii. Some observed species of planarians include Schmidtea polychroa, Polycelis tenuis, Schmidtea lugubris, and Dendrocoelum lacteum.

Several aquatic plant and plant species live in or near the lake, including Lemna minor, Potamogeton natans, Nuphar luteum, Schoenoplectus lacustris, Cladium mariscus, Phragmites australis (which forms a discontinuous belt around the lake), Typha latifolia, Salicetalia purpureae, Caricion gracilis, Mentha aquatica, Caricetum pseudocyperi, Callitriche hamulata, Callitriche obtusangula, Ceratophyllum demersum, Chara globularis, Cladophora sp., Elodea canadensis, Fontinalis antipyretica, Hippuris vulgaris, Lemna trisulca, Nitella gracilis, Potamogeton crispus, Potamogeton pectinatus, Potamogeton trichoides, Spirogyra sp., Vaucheria sp., and Zannichellia palustris. A sponge, Ephydatia fluviatilis, has also been recorded living on Phragmites australis.

Over 105 species of birds have been recorded over multiple surveys at Lake Piediluco, although this isn't ornithologically significant in terms of bird diversity or richness as compared to other nearby bodies of water such as Lake Trasimeno or the Colfiorito marsh.

== Gallery ==
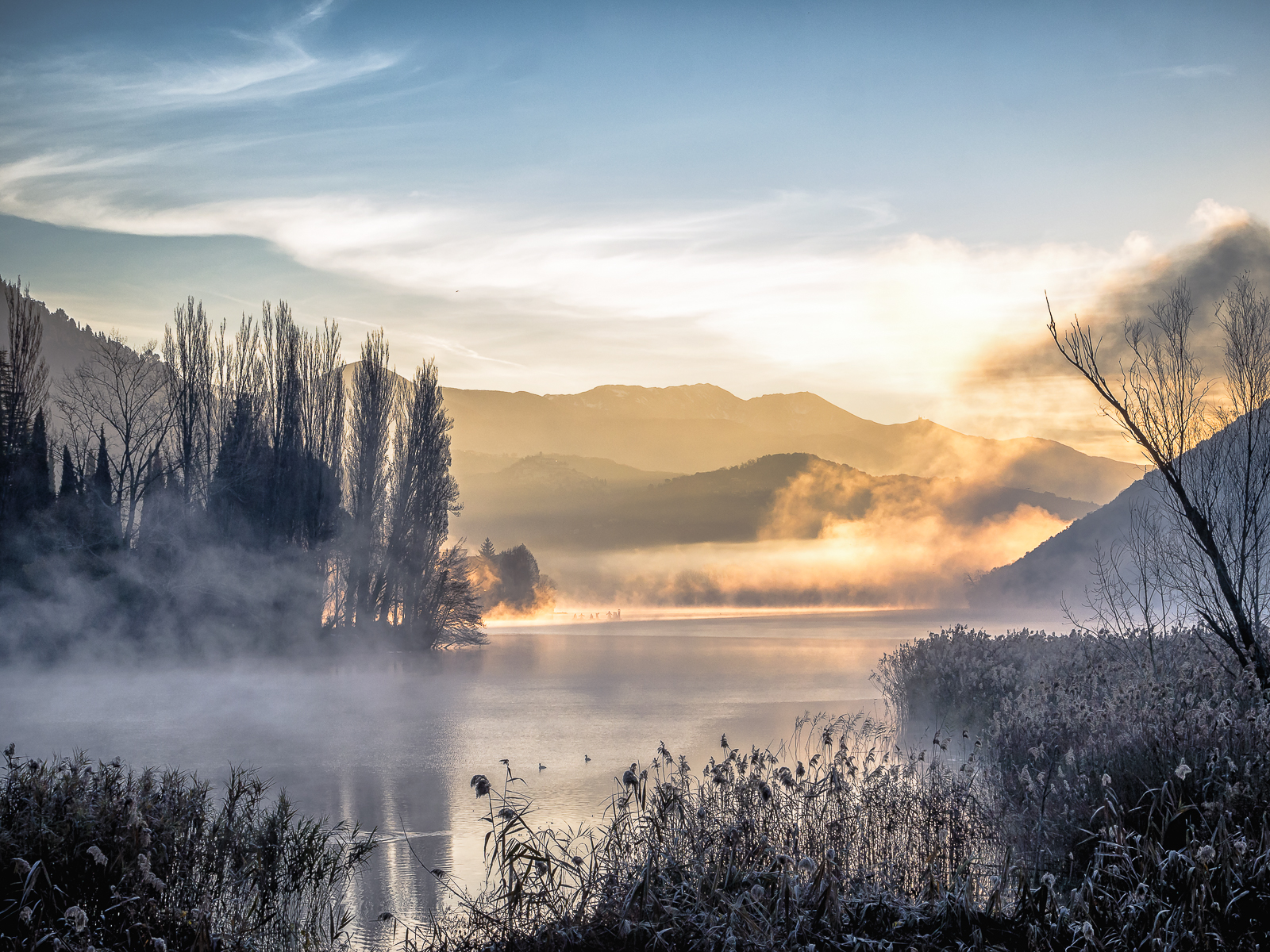
Dawn on the lake during winter

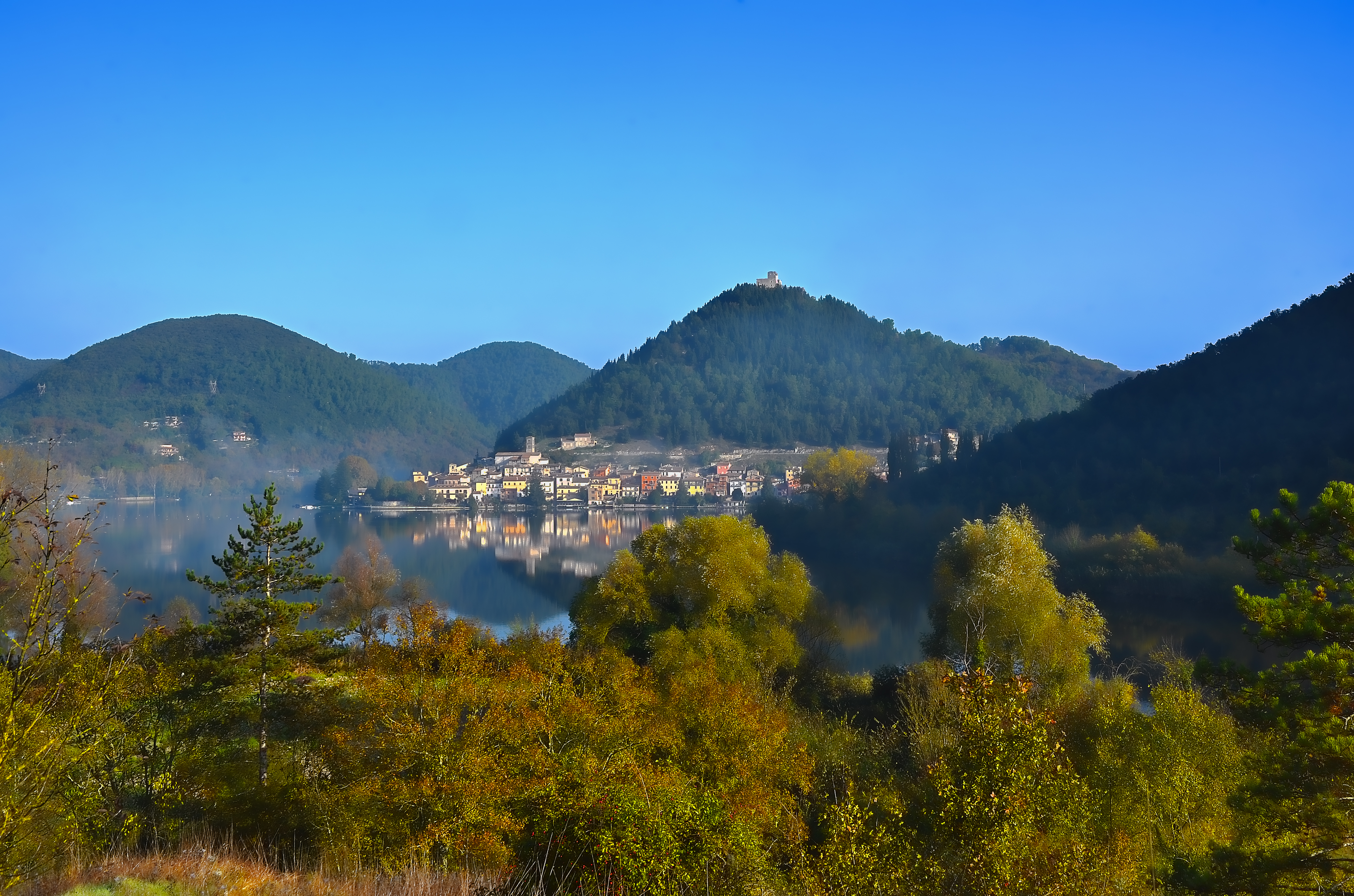
Lake and the citadel

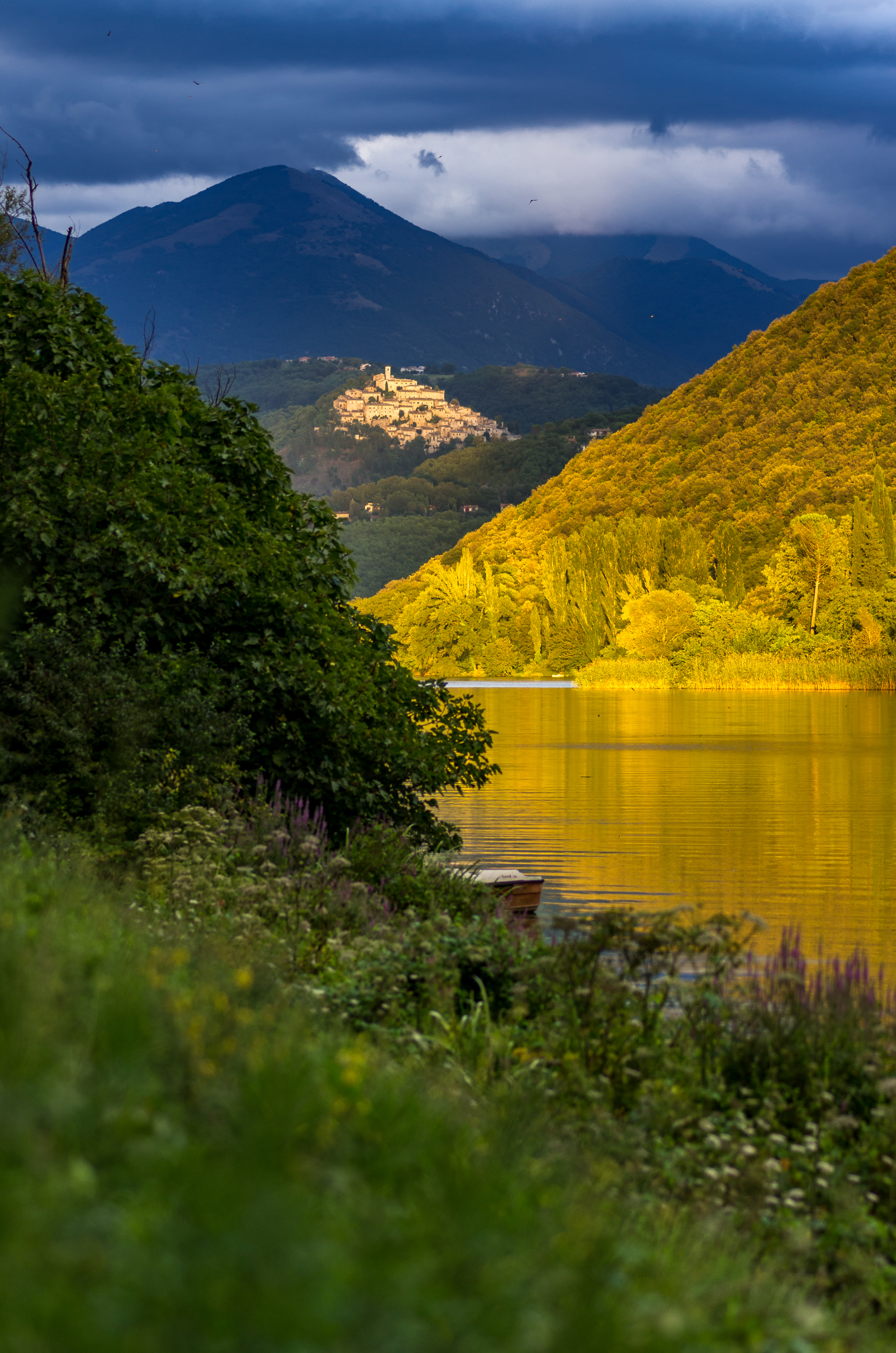
The lake with Labro's castle on the background

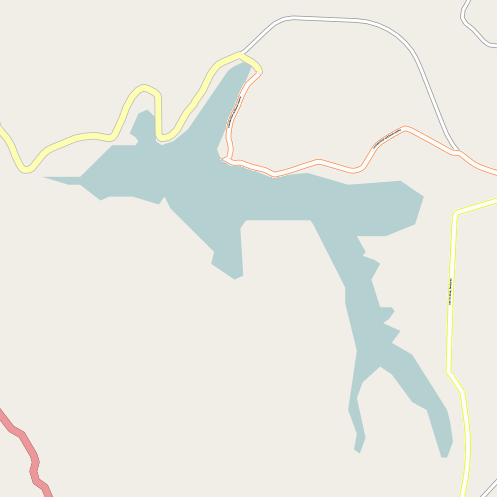
Lake map
