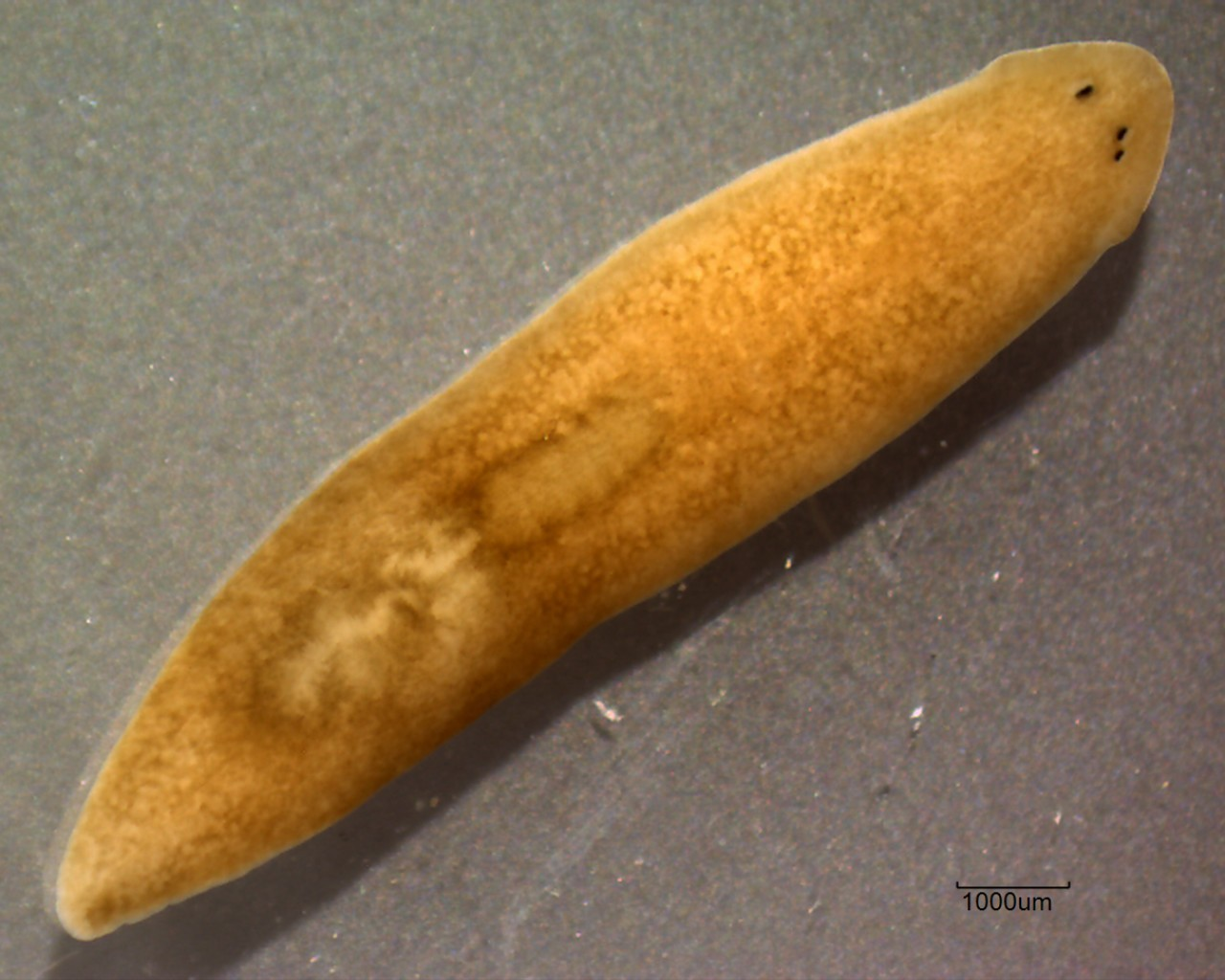
- Preserved specimen of D. aenigma

Scientific classification
- Domain: Eukaryota
- Kingdom: Animalia
- Phylum: Platyhelminthes
- Order: Tricladida
- Family: Dugesiidae
- Genus: Dugesia
- Species: D. aenigma

Binomial name
- Dugesia aenigma de Vries, 1984
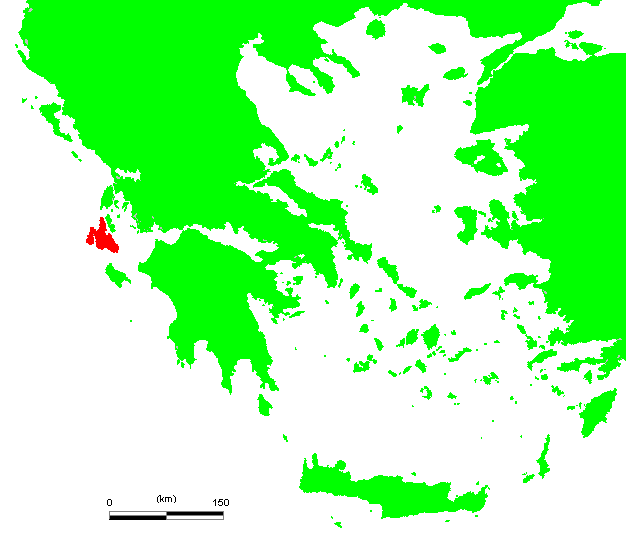
- Cephalonia, Greece

Synonyms
- Planaria sagitta (Schmidt, 1861 (partially; Cephalonia material))

= Dugesia aenigma =

Species of flatworm

Dugesia aenigma is a species of dugesiid triclad that inhabits freshwater bodies of Cephalonia, Greece.

Preserved specimens are up to 8 millimetres (0.31 in) in length and 2 millimetres (0.079 in) in width.

== Phylogeny ==
The most inclusive molecular analysis of Dugesia carried out shows that D. aenigma is closely related with other Greek species, mainly with those inhabiting the Ionian Sea.

- Dugesia
  - - D. aethiopica
    - D. sicula
  - - - - D. etrusca
        - D. ilvana
      - - D. gonocephala
        - - D. benazzii
          - D. hepta
    - - D. cretica
      - - - - D. elegans
            - - D. damoae
              - D. effusa
          - - D. improvisa
            - D. ariadnae
        - - D. arcadia
          - - D. malickyi
            - - D. aenigma
              - - D. sagitta
                - D. parasagitta
