= Evelio =

Evelio is a given name. Notable people with the name include:

- Evelio Boal (1884–1921), Spanish graphic designer, trade unionist and anarchist
- Evelio Calderín (1896 – death unknown), Cuban pitcher in the Negro leagues between 1917 and 1924
- Evelio Cardozo (born 2001), Argentine professional footballer
- Evelio Díaz-Cía (1902–1984), the Archbishop of the Archdiocese of Havana
- Evelio Droz (born 1937), Puerto Rican former Olympic basketball player
- Evelio González (born 1952), Cuban fencer
- Evelio Grillo (1919–2008), American writer and community organizer
- Evelio Hernández (baseball) (1930–2015), Cuban right-handed pitcher
- Evelio Hernández (footballer) (born 1984), Venezuelan footballer
- Evelio Javier (1942–1986), Filipino politician
- Evelio Leonardia (born 1952), Filipino realtor, lawyer, politician and Mayor of Bacolod
- Evelio Menjivar-Ayala (born 1970), Salvadoran priest of the Catholic Church in the Archdiocese of Washington
- Evelio Otero (1920–1988), the first television anchorman in Puerto Rico, one of the first in Latin America
- Evelio Planas (born 1930), Cuban former sprinter
- Evelio Arias Ramos (1966–2008), Mexican actor, comedian and singer
- Evelio Rosero (born 1958), Colombian writer and journalist
- Evelio Tieles (born 1941), Cuban violinist and professor

== See also ==
- Evelio B. Javier Airport, the only airport in the province of Antique in the Philippines
- Evelio Javier Day, public holiday in the Philippines
- Eva Leo
- Evelia
- Eviella
- Eyvallah (disambiguation)
