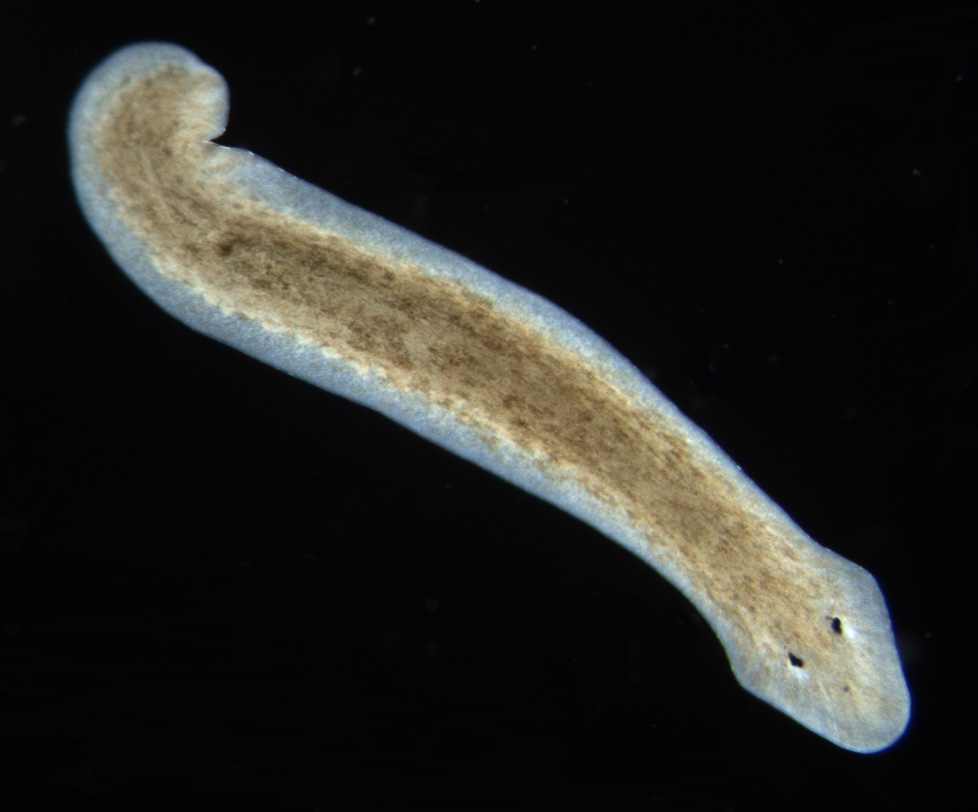
- Asexual specimen of Dugesia subtentaculata

Scientific classification
- Kingdom: Animalia
- Phylum: Platyhelminthes
- Order: Tricladida
- Family: Dugesiidae
- Genus: Dugesia
- Species: D. subtentaculata

Binomial name
- Dugesia subtentaculata (Draparnaud, 1801)

Synonyms
- Planaria subtentaculata; Euplanaria gonocephala; Dugesia iberica

= Dugesia subtentaculata =

Species of flatworm

Dugesia subtentaculata is a species of planarian that inhabits the freshwater of Southern France, several localities on the Iberian Peninsula (including Catalonia), Mallorca, Morocco and Algeria.

In 1986 De Vries designated a neotype for D. subtentaculata after the original type material was lost. She also synonymized the species D. iberica, described from Mallorca and Iberian Peninsula, with D. subtentaculta. Both the neotype and the holotype are from the surroundings of Montpellier, from a locality where asexual specimens of D. subtentaculata and sexual individuals of D. gonocephala are found living together.

== Phylogeny ==
Dugesia subtentaculata is related to other European Dugesia species. However, its exact phylogenetic position is not known.

Phylogenetic tree obtained by Lázaro and colleagues in 2009:

- Dugesia
  - - D. sicula
    - D. aethiopica
  - - - - D. japonica
        - - D. ryukyuensis
          - - D. notogaea
            - D. bengalensis
    - - D. subtentaculata
      - - D. gonocephala
        - - D. liguriensis
          - - D. etrusca
            - D. ilvana
      - - D. benazzii
        - D. hepta
