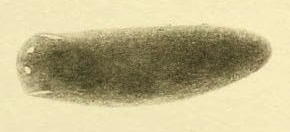

Scientific classification
- Kingdom: Animalia
- Phylum: Platyhelminthes
- Order: Tricladida
- Family: Dugesiidae
- Genus: Dugesia
- Species: D. annandalei

Binomial name
- Dugesia annandalei (Kaburaki, 1918)

Synonyms
- Planaria annandalei Kaburaki, 1918

= Dugesia annandalei =

Species of planarian

Dugesia annandalei is a species of dugesiid planarian that is native to Myanmar. It is named after Nelson Annandale.

== Description ==
Dugesia annandalei has a broad, round head with a very slight narrowing as a "neck". The back end is rounded. It's about six millimeters long and 1.5 mm wide. The backside is a buffed brown that darkens near the middle across the body, from the eyes to the back end. The underside is paler in color. There are two eyes, crescent-like in shape, each surrounded by an unpigmented oval. There is an auricle on each side of the head, which appears as a colorless streak.
