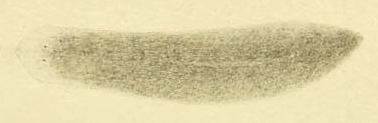

Scientific classification
- Kingdom: Animalia
- Phylum: Platyhelminthes
- Order: Tricladida
- Family: Dugesiidae
- Genus: Dugesia
- Species: D. burmaensis

Binomial name
- Dugesia burmaensis (Kaburaki, 1918)

Synonyms
- Planaria burmaensis Kaburaki, 1918; Euplanaria burmaensis (Kaburaki, 1918)

= Dugesia burmaensis =

Species of flatworm

Dugesia burmaensis is a species of freshwater dugesiid found in Burma. The species was described from six individuals collected from Inle Lake, Shan State.
