= Dugesia notogaea =

Scientific classification
- Kingdom: Animalia
- Phylum: Platyhelminthes
- Order: Tricladida
- Family: Dugesiidae
- Genus: Dugesia
- Species: D. notogaea

Binomial name
- Dugesia notogaea Sluys & Kawakatsu, 1998

Species of flatworm

Dugesia notogaea is a species of dugesiid triclad that inhabits freshwater bodies of north Queensland, Australia.

== Phylogeny ==
D. notogaea position in relation with other Dugesia species after the work of Lázaro et al., 2009:

- Dugesia
  - - D. sicula
    - D. aethiopica
  - - - - D. japonica
        - - D. ryukyuensis
          - - D. notogaea
            - D. bengalensis
    - - D. subtentaculata
      - - D. gonocephala
        - - D. liguriensis
          - - D. etrusca
            - D. ilvana
      - - D. benazzii
        - D. hepta
