= Dugesia sicula =

Scientific classification
- Domain: Eukaryota
- Kingdom: Animalia
- Phylum: Platyhelminthes
- Order: Tricladida
- Family: Dugesiidae
- Genus: Dugesia
- Species: D. sicula

Binomial name
- Dugesia sicula Lepori, 1948

Species of flatworm

Dugesia sicula is a species of dugesiid triclad that lives in freshwater bodies of the Mediterranean Basin, where it is widely distributed. It has been reported from Sicily, Elba and Mallorca, Eivissa, Sardinia, Algeria, Tunisia, Morocco and Crete.

== Morphology ==
D. sicula individuals have an asymmetrical penis papilla, with a diaphragm at the base, separating the seminal vesicle from the ejaculatory duct. This duct is ventral and it opens subterminally. The seminal vesicle is wrapped by a thin layer of bulbar muscles. The penis papilla is weakly muscular and more parenchymatic.

== Reproduction ==
D. sicula is known to reproduce sexual and asexually.

== Phylogeny ==
D. sicula position in relation with other Dugesia species after the work of Lázaro et al., 2009:

- Dugesia
  - - D. sicula
    - D. aethiopica
  - - - - D. japonica
        - - D. ryukyuensis
          - - D. notogaea
            - D. bengalensis
    - - D. subtentaculata
      - - D. gonocephala
        - - D. liguriensis
          - - D. etrusca
            - D. ilvana
      - - D. benazzii
        - D. hepta
