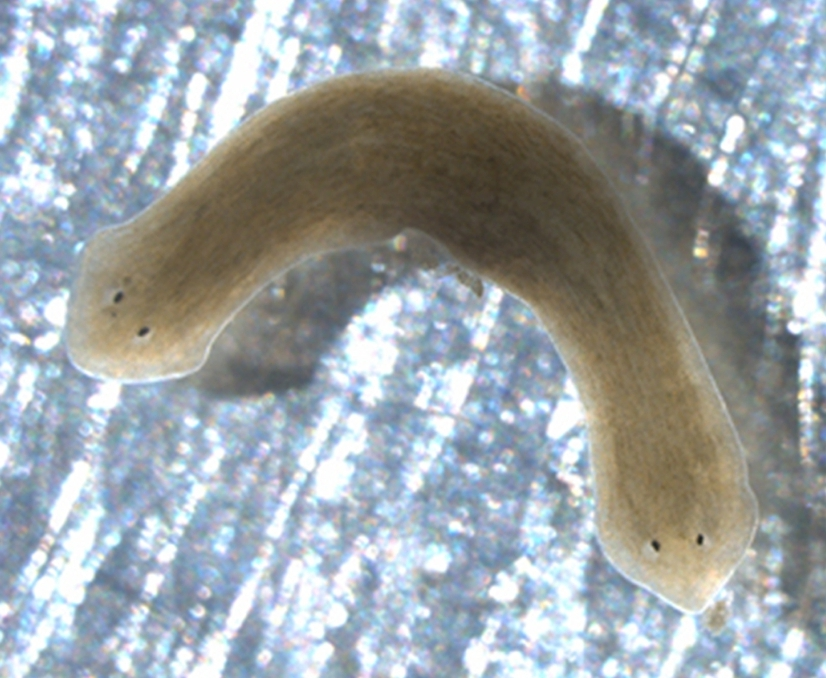
- Two headed D. japonica that regenerated from a trunk fragment exposed to Praziquantel.

Scientific classification
- Kingdom: Animalia
- Phylum: Platyhelminthes
- Order: Tricladida
- Family: Dugesiidae
- Genus: Dugesia
- Species: D. japonica

Binomial name
- Dugesia japonica Ichikawa & Kawakatsu, 1964

= Dugesia japonica =

Species of flatworm

Dugesia japonica is a species of freshwater planarian that inhabits freshwater bodies of East Asia, including Japan, Korea, Taiwan, China and north-eastern Siberia. However, molecular studies suggest that Dugesia japonica is polyphyletic and different populations across its area of occurrence constitute distinct species.

== Phylogeny ==
D. japonica position in relation with other Dugesia species after the work of Lázaro et al., 2009:

- Dugesia
  - - D. sicula
    - D. aethiopica
  - - - - D. japonica
        - - D. ryukyuensis
          - - D. notogaea
            - D. bengalensis
    - - D. subtentaculata
      - - D. gonocephala
        - - D. liguriensis
          - - D. etrusca
            - D. ilvana
      - - D. benazzii
        - D. hepta

== Space Experimentation ==
A study was published in 2017 in which a Dugesia Japonica trunk fragment had been sent into space, and grew with two heads, one on either end of the trunk. However, the influence of space conditions on this phenomenon is debated.
