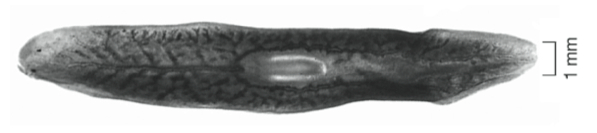
- Dorsal view of preserved specimen.

Scientific classification
- Kingdom: Animalia
- Phylum: Platyhelminthes
- Order: Tricladida
- Family: Dugesiidae
- Genus: Dugesia
- Species: D. artesiana

Binomial name
- Dugesia artesiana Sluys & Grant, 2007
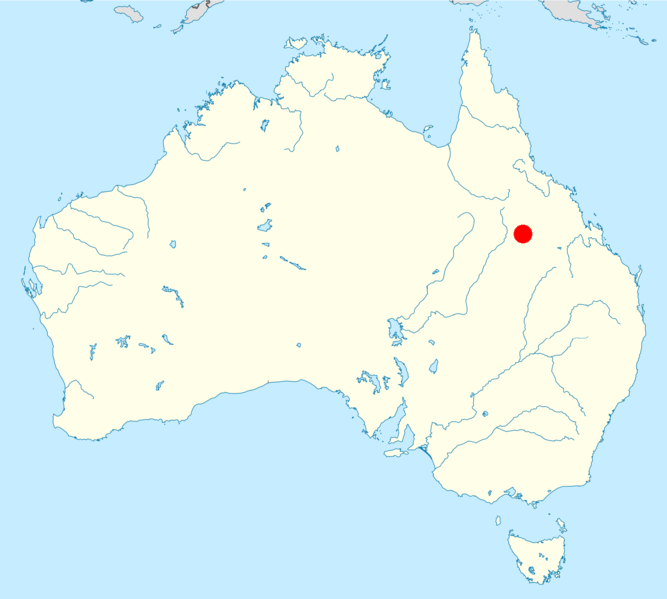
- Distribution of D. artesiana

= Dugesia artesiana =

Species of flatworm

Dugesia artesiana is a species of dugesiid triclad found in Queensland, Australia.

== Etymology ==
The specific epithet artesiana is derived from the species' type locality, within the Great Artesian Basin.

== Description ==
=== Diagnostic features ===
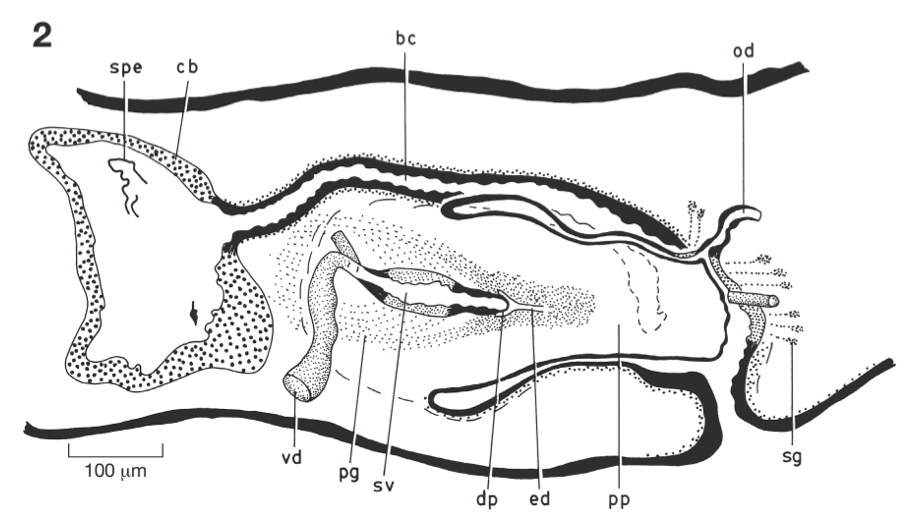
Sagittal reconstruction of the holotype copulatory apparatus. Anterior to the left.

D. artesiana is characterized by a unique combination of morphological features of the copulatory apparatus: Presumably central ejaculatory duct, asymmetrical openings of the oviducts into the bursal canal, infranucleated bursal canal, absence of ectal reinforcement, small diaphragm, and absence of a duct between intrabulbar seminal vesicle an diaphragm.

=== General description ===
Preserved specimens are up to 14 mm in length and 2 mm in width. They have a constant light yellow-brown dorsal color with a variable density of dark specks. That makes the dorsal pigmentation ranges from dark brown to light yellow-brown. The color lightens at the body margins and over the pharyngeal region. The ventral surface is paler. The number of pigment granules observed in the histological sections are variable among individuals. They have two eye cups where head narrows. The pharynx is located posteriorly in the body. The mouth opening is at the posterior end of the pharyngeal pocket.

== Distribution ==
D. artesiana has been only reported from two sampling sites, with a distance between them of 8 km. The holotype is original from Edgbaston Station, Blue eye spring, Queensland, Australia. The other known locality is also in Edgbaston.

There is only another Dugesia species reported from Australia, D. notogaea, found in Hervey Range, Queensland.

== Ecology ==
This species has been found associated with springs.
