= Scardinius dergle =

Conservation status
- Near Threatened (IUCN 3.1)

Scientific classification
- Kingdom: Animalia
- Phylum: Chordata
- Class: Actinopterygii
- Order: Cypriniformes
- Family: Leuciscidae
- Subfamily: Leuciscinae
- Genus: Scardinius
- Species: S. dergle

Binomial name
- Scardinius dergle Heckel & Kner, 1858

Species of fish

Scardinius dergle, the Dalmatian rudd is a species of freshwater ray-finned fish belonging to the family Leuciscidae, which includes the daces, Eurasian minnows and related fishes. This species is endemic to the Western Balkans.

== Taxonomy ==
Scardinius dergle was first formally described in 1858 by the Austrian ichthyologists Johann Jakob Heckel and Rudolf Kner with its type locality givens as the Kerka and Zermanga rivers in Dalmatia and Livno in Bosnia. This species was formerly considered to be a synonym of the common rudd (S. erythrophthalmus). The Dalmatian rudd belongs to the genus Scardinius, commonly referred to as rudds, which belongs to the subfamily Leuciscinae of the family Leuciscidae.

A population of rudd in Lake Vrana on the island of Cres, not to be confused with Lake Vrana, has been assigned to this species but there are morphological differences and its taxonomic status needs to be ascertained.

== Etymology ==
Scardinius acarnanicus belongs to the genus Scardinius and this name is thought to be a latinisation of scardafa, a vernacular name in Italy, Rome in particular, for the Tiber rudd (Scardinius scardafa). The Specific name, dergle, is a vernacular name for this fish in southern Dalmatia.

== Description ==
Scardinius dergle may be told apart from other Balkan rudd species by having between 40 and 43 scales along the lateral line; the anal fin has 10 1/2 branched fin rays; 10-13 gill rakers; the dorsal profile of the head is straight, snout pointing forward, tip at or slightly below level of the middle of the eye; there is no hump behind the eye; the eye is not close to the dorsal profile of the head in lateral view; the articulation of lower jaw is under or to the front of the eye; the ventral profile of the head has an obvious angle at the articulation of the lower jaw; the head length is equivalent to 28-32% of the standard length while the depth of the body is equivalent to 28-38% of the standard length; and all fins grey in adults with a standard length greater than 6 cm (2.4 in). This species has a maximum standard length of 15 cm (5.9 in).

== Distribution and habitat ==
Scardinius dergle is endemic to the Dinaric Karst occurring in the Krka and Cetina river systems in the Dalmatian Zagora of Croatia, and in the Livanjsko Polje in Bosnia and Herzegovina, thos polje has anatural connection to the Cetina through underground karstic channels. There is an isolated population in Lake Vrana, northwest of the Krka estuary. This species prefres slow moving water with aquatic vegetation in spring fed rivers, lakes and wetlands, it has colonised artificial habitats such as canals and reservoirs.
