= Scardinius knezevici =

Conservation status
- Vulnerable (IUCN 3.1)

Scientific classification
- Kingdom: Animalia
- Phylum: Chordata
- Class: Actinopterygii
- Order: Cypriniformes
- Family: Leuciscidae
- Subfamily: Leuciscinae
- Genus: Scardinius
- Species: S. knezevici

Binomial name
- Scardinius knezevici Bianco & Kottelat, 2005

Species of fish

Scardinius knezevici, the Skadar rudd, is a species of freshwater ray-finned fish belonging to the family Leuciscidae, which includes the daces, Eurasian minnows and related fishes. This species is endemic to the Western Balkans.

== Taxonomy ==
Scardinius knezevici was first formally described in 2005 by the ichthyologists Pier Giorgio Bianco and Maurice Kottelat with its type locality given as Lake Skadar, near a bridge crossing a branch of the lake, near Vranjina village, at former Podgorica University Ichthyological station in the Republic of Montenegro. This species belongs to the genus Scardinius, commonly referred to as rudds, which belongs to the subfamily Leuciscinae of the family Leuciscidae.

== Etymology ==
Scardinius knezevici belongs to the genus Scardinius and this name is thought to be a latinisation of scardafa, a vernacular name in Italy, Rome in particular, for the Tiber rudd (Scardinius scardafa). The Specific name is an eponym and honours the Yugoslav (Montenegrin) biologist Borivoj Knezevic who studies and worked to conserve the freshwater fishes of Montenegro.

== Description ==
Scardinius knezevici may de told apart from other Balkan rudd species by having a less deep body, between 36 and 38 scales along its lateral line. This fish has a silver body with each scale bearing a dark crescent mark; 9 branched fin rays in the anal fin; 11 or 12 gill rakers, the back is humped behind the eyes; the articulation of the lower jaw is in front of the eye; the eye is not close to the dorsal profile of the head in lateral view; and all fins greyish. The Skadar rudd has a maximum total length of 29.5 cm (11.6 in) and a maximum published weight of 364.2 g (12.85 oz).

== Distribution and habitat ==
Scardinius knezevici is found in the Western Balkans in the basins of Lake Skadar and Lake Ohrid in Albania, Montenegro and North Macedonia. Within these lakes the Skadar rudd reportedly lives in the littoral zone near to beds of aquatic vegetation> In the winter they may gather at spring ouflows where the water is warmer.
