= Dugesia golanica =

Scientific classification
- Domain: Eukaryota
- Kingdom: Animalia
- Phylum: Platyhelminthes
- Order: Tricladida
- Family: Dugesiidae
- Genus: Dugesia
- Species: D. golanica

Binomial name
- Dugesia golanica Bromley & Benazzi, 1991

Species of flatworm

Dugesia golanica is a species of dugesiid triclad that inhabits freshwater bodies of Israel. The species is named after the Golan Heights.
