= Scardinius acarnanicus =

Conservation status
- Endangered (IUCN 3.1)

Scientific classification
- Kingdom: Animalia
- Phylum: Chordata
- Class: Actinopterygii
- Order: Cypriniformes
- Family: Leuciscidae
- Subfamily: Leuciscinae
- Genus: Scardinius
- Species: S. acarnanicus

Binomial name
- Scardinius acarnanicus Economidis, 1991

Species of fish

Scardinius acarnanicus, the Trichonis rudd, is a species of freshwater ray-finned fish belonging to the family Leuciscidae, which includes the daces, Eurasian minnows and related fishes. This species is endemic to Western Greece.

== Taxonomy ==
Scardinius acarnanicus was first formally described in 1991 by the Greek ichthyologist Panos Stavros Economidis with its type locality givens as the Acheleoos River and lakes Trichonis, Lyssimachia, Ozeros, and Amvrakia in the Acheleoos River basin, Greece. In 1939, this taxon was named as Scardinius scardafa plotizza forma acarnanicus by Alexander I. Stephanidis but this name was invalid because it referred to a taxon that was below the subspecific level. This species belongs to the genus Scardinius, commonly referred to as rudds, which belongs to the subfamily Leuciscinae of the family Leuciscidae.

== Etymology ==
Scardinius acarnanicus belongs to the genus Scardinius and this name is thought to be a latinisation of scardafa, a vernacular name in Italy, Rome in particular, for the Tiber rudd (Scardinius scardafa). The Specific name, arcarnanicus, means "belonging to Acarnania", the region of western-central Greece covering the drainage system of the Acheloos drainage basin.

== Description ==
Scardinius acarnanicus may de told apart from other Balkan rudd species by the dark midlateral stripe seen in juveniles with a standard length of less than 7 cm (2.8 in) and in having between 37 and 42 scales along its lateral line. Other distinguishing features include: the anal fin typically has 10 1/2 branched fin rays; there are between 13 and 16 pectoral fin rays; 12 to 17 gill rakers; the dorsal profile of the head is clearly concave, with an upward pointing snout with its tip higher than the centre of the eye; the eye is close to or touches with dorsal profile of the head in lateral view; the articulation of lower jaw is in front of the eye; and the length of the head is equivalent to 24-30% of the standard length. The Trichonis rudd has a maximum total length of 38 cm (15 in), a maximum weight of 620 g (22 oz) and a has a reported lifespan of up to 11 years.

== Distribution and habitat ==
Scardinius acarnanicus is found only in the western part of the mainland of Greece where it is native only to the lower part of the Achelous ricer system, including lakes Trichonida, Lysimachia, Ozeros and Amvrakia. It has been introduced to Lake Ziros in Epirus. This species is found in slow flowing rivers, drainage channels and the pelagic zone of lakes.

== Biology ==
Scardinius acarnanicus spawns between March and July, the edhesive eggs are laid in aquatic vegetation and hatch in 5 days. The young fish form schools with other fish, especially with the Hellenic minnowroach (Tropidophoxinellus hellenicus). The juveniles feed on phytoplankton while the adults feed mainlyon macrophytes, although they are opportunistic omnivores and will feed on invertebrates and smaller fishes.

== Conservation ==
Scardinius acarnanicus is classified as Vulnerable by the International Union for Conservation of Nature. The threats to this species include damming, water abstraction, pollution and invasive species.
