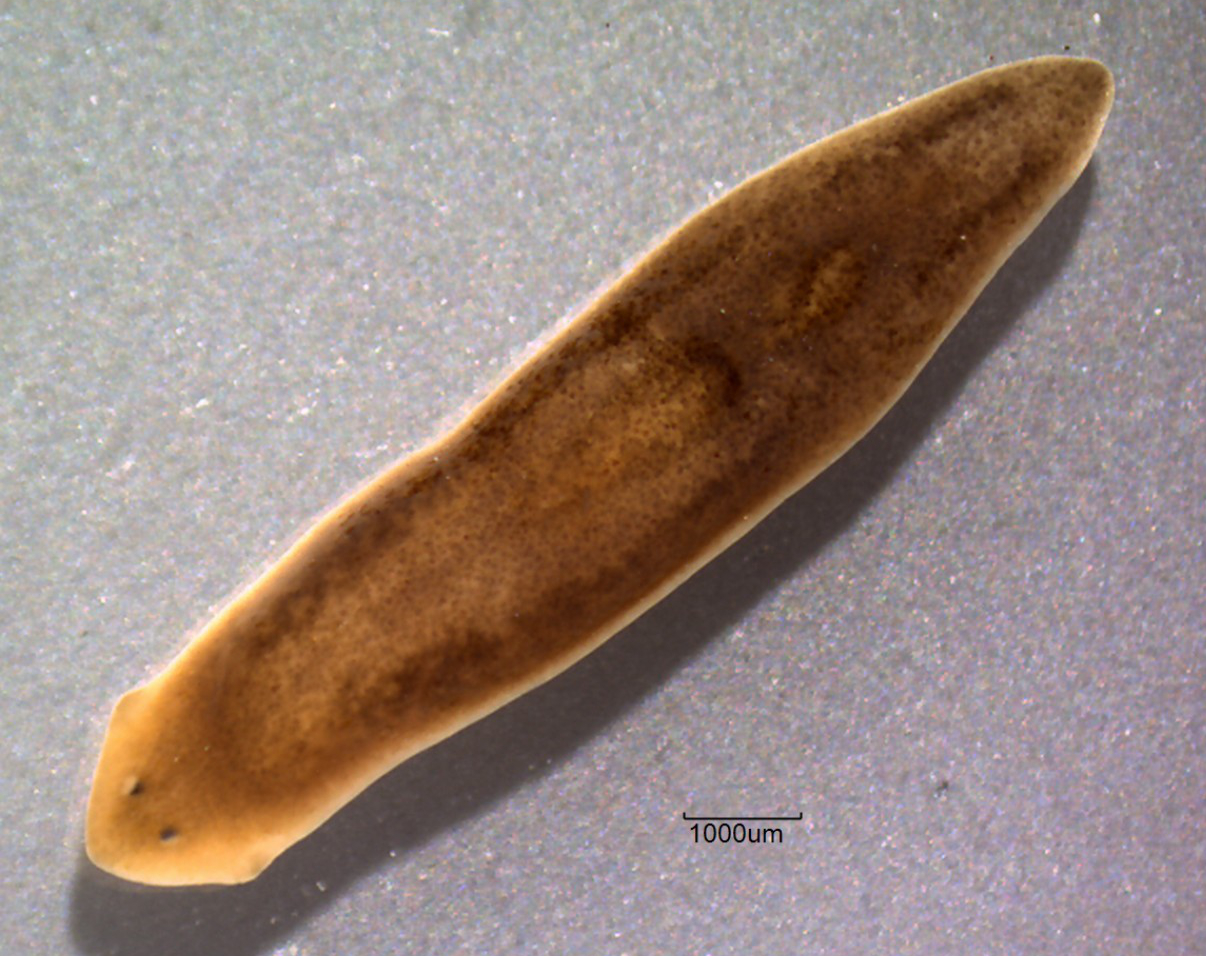
- Preserved specimen

Scientific classification
- Kingdom: Animalia
- Phylum: Platyhelminthes
- Order: Tricladida
- Family: Dugesiidae
- Genus: Dugesia
- Species: D. sagitta

Binomial name
- Dugesia sagitta (Schmidt, 1861)
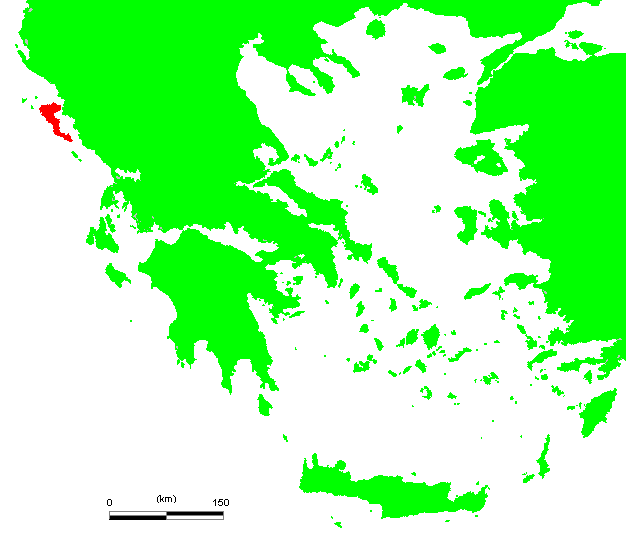
- Corfu, Greece

Synonyms
- Planaria sagitta Schmidt, 1861; Planaria gonocephala; Komarek, 1925; Dugesia gonocephala; Ball, 1979; De Vries & Ball, 1980

= Dugesia sagitta =

Species of flatworm

Dugesia sagitta is a species of dugesiid triclad that inhabits the rivers of Corfu, Greece. The specimens of this species are up to 10 millimetres (0.39 in) long and 3 millimetres (0.12 in) wide.

In 1925 Komarek synonymized Dugesia sagitta (then Planaria sagitta) with D. gonocephala, because the morphological description given by Schmidt when the species was named in 1861 was not accurate. In 1984 D. sagitta was back from the synonymization thanks to the contribution of a more accurate morphological description done by de Vries. In 1861 Schmidt also described D. sagitta from Cephalonia, but de Vries demonstrated that it was actually D. aenigma.

The type locality of this species is Messonghi river, Corfu, Greece.

== Karyology ==
This Dugesia species, from what only sexual reproducing specimens are known, have a karyotype of 2n=16, constituted only by acrocentric chromosomes.
