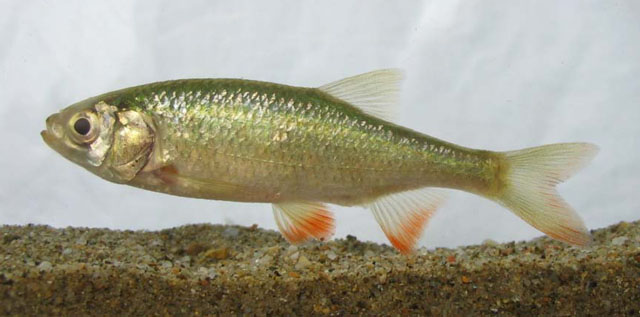

Conservation status
- Extinct in the Wild (IUCN 3.1)

Scientific classification
- Kingdom: Animalia
- Phylum: Chordata
- Class: Actinopterygii
- Division: Teleostei
- Order: Cypriniformes
- Family: Leuciscidae
- Genus: Scardinius
- Species: S. racovitzai

Binomial name
- Scardinius racovitzai G. J. Müller, 1958

= Scardinius racovitzai =

Species of fish

Scardinius racovitzai, Racovitza's rudd, is a species of freshwater ray-finned fish belonging to the family Leuciscidae, which includes the daces, Eurasian minnows and related fishes. This species is extinct in the wild and was formerly endemic to Romania.

== Taxonomy ==
Scardinius racovitzai was first formally described in 1958 by the Romanian biologist Geza Julius Müller with its type locality given as Thermal pond Petzea, near Oradea, tributary of Crișul Repede in western Romania. This species belongs to the genus Scardinius, commonly referred to as rudds, which belongs to the subfamily Leuciscinae of the family Leuciscidae.

== Etymology ==
Scardinius racovitzai belongs to the genus Scardinius and this name is thought to be a latinisation of scardafa, a vernacular name in Italy, Rome in particular, for the Tiber rudd (Scardinius scardafa). The specific name is an eponym and honours the Romanian cave biologist and zoologist Emil G. Racovitza, to mark the tenth anniversary of his death.

== Distribution ==
Scardinius racovitzai was endemic to one small lake fed by a geothermal spring near Oradea in Bihor County in northwestern Romania. This lake is known locally as Pețea or Ochiul Mare and is located in the upper reaches of the Peța River, a minor left-bank tributary of the Crișul Repede River in the upper Tisza River system. Captive populations of this species are held in institutions in Hungary, Czechia and Austria.

== Extinction ==
Scardinius racovitzai inhabited one densely vegetated lake fed by a hot spring, this lake dried up completely in 2014 and this species became extinct in the wild at that point. The lake had been drying up for a long time as due to water abstraction, pollution was also a factor in the degradation of the habitat.
