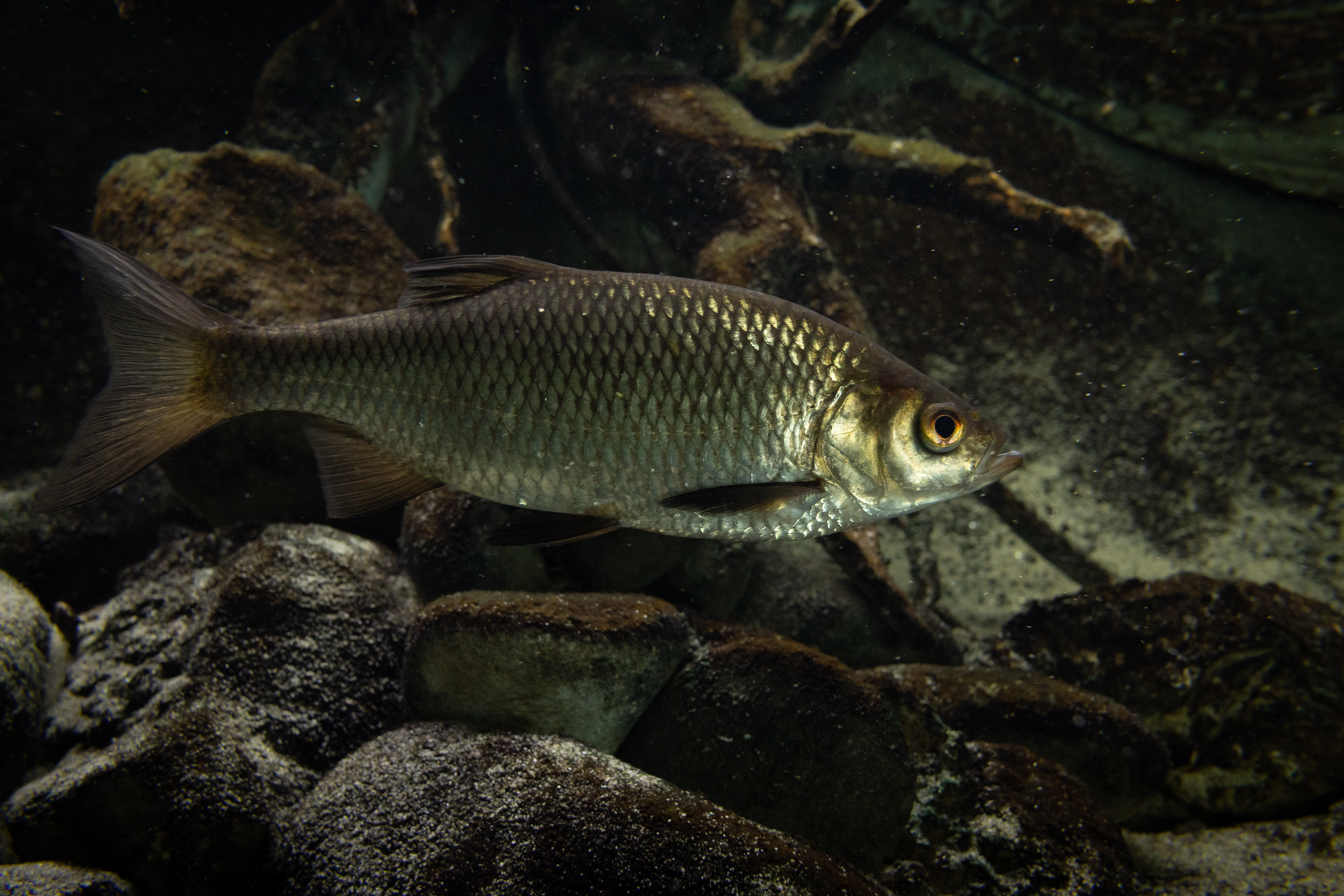

Conservation status
- Least Concern (IUCN 3.1)

Scientific classification
- Kingdom: Animalia
- Phylum: Chordata
- Class: Actinopterygii
- Order: Cypriniformes
- Family: Leuciscidae
- Subfamily: Leuciscinae
- Genus: Scardinius
- Species: S. hesperidicus

Binomial name
- Scardinius hesperidicus Bonaparte, 1845

Synonyms
- Scardinius rhodophthalmus Heckel, 1845

= Scardinius hesperidicus =

Species of fish

Scardinius hesperidicus, the Italian rudd is a species of freshwater ray-finned fish belonging to the family Leuciscidae, which includes the daces, Eurasian minnows and related fishes. This species is found in the Po and Adriatic drainages east of the Po in Italy, San Marino and Switzerland, and has been introduced into other area watersheds, especially in Italy.

== Taxonomy ==
Scardinius hesperidicus was first formally described in 1845 by the French art collector and biologist Charles Lucien Bonaparte with its type locality given as the lakes of Piedmont in Italy. This species was formerly considered to be a synonym of the common rudd (S. erythrophthalmus). The Italian rudd belongs to the genus Scardinius, commonly referred to as rudds, which belongs to the subfamily Leuciscinae of the family Leuciscidae.

The Italian rudd is very similar to the Tiber rudd (S. scardafa) of southern and Central Italy and have been treated as conspecific. These two rudds do show meristic and molecular differences and are currently treated as separate valid, albeit closely related species. The sister taxon to these two is the Neretva rudd (S. plotizza).

== Etymology ==
Scardinius hesperidicus belongs to the genus Scardinius and this name is thought to be a latinisation of scardafa, a vernacular name in Italy, Rome in particular, for the Tiber rudd (Scardinius scardafa). The Specific name, hesperidicus, means "belonging to the Hesperides, these were nymphs in Greek mythology who were said to tend a paradisical garden in a far western corner of the world, this may be an allusion to Piedmont being in the far west of Italy.

== Description ==
Scardinius hesperidicus may be told apart from other Mediterranean rudd species by having between 36 and 39 scales along the lateral line; the anal fin has between 10 and 12 1/2 branched fin rays; 10-13 gill rakers; the dorsal profile of the head is straight or a litte convex with the snout pointing forward, tip at or slightly above the level of the middle of the eye; there is no hump behind the eye; the eye is not close to the dorsal profile of the head in lateral view; the articulation of lower jaw is to the front of the eye; the head length is equivalent to 24-272% of the standard length while the depth of the body is equivalent to 35-39% of the standard length; and all fins dark grey in adults with a standard length greater than 10 cm (3.9 in). This species has a maximum standard length of 40 cm (16 in).

== Distribution and habitat ==
Scardinius hesperidicus is endemic to the northern drainage basin of the Adriatic Sea where its range goes from the Isonzo in Friuli-Venezia Giulia south to the Vomano in Abruzzo. It is also found in the rivers draining into the Ligurian and Tyrrhenian Seas in the drainages of the Arno, Ombrone, Tiber and Volturno but there is a possibility that the Italian rudd is an introduced species in these systems. It has been introduced to some subalpine lakes in France and Switzerland. This is a species of slow or still waters in rivers but it readily colonises drainage channels, canals and reservoirs.

== Biology ==
Scardinius hesperidicus is a demersal fish schooling fish, although it can be pelagic in smaller lakes. The shoals ten to congregate in the littoral and benthic zones of lakes, down to 30 m (98 ft), frequently close to reedbeds or other macrophyte beds. There are omnivorous and feed on both plankton and benthic invertebrates, as well as plant matter and insects taken from the surface. These fishes can live up to 15 years and attain sexual maturirty at 2 or 3 years old. The spawning season runs from March to July. Females spawn several times in a season and the eggs are laid among submerged vegetation.
