= Spathula =

Scientific classification
- Domain: Eukaryota
- Kingdom: Animalia
- Phylum: Platyhelminthes
- Order: Tricladida
- Family: Dugesiidae
- Genus: Spathula; Nurse, 1950

Species
- See text

Genus of flatworms

Spathula is a genus of dugesiid triclad. Its species are found in Australia and New Zealand.

Until 1977, Spathula was ranked as a subgenus of Dugesia. The name of the genus derives from the Latin spathula, meaning "broad, flat piece".

== Description ==
Specimens of this genus have a triangular head. Along with this, the genus was originally defined as planarians with "one atrium (undivided) around the penis, into which opens the bursa stalk" and numerous testes.

== Species ==
The following species are recognised in the genus Spathula

- Spathula agelaea Hay & Ball, 1979
- Spathula alba Allison, 1997
- Spathula camara Ball, 1977
- Spathula dittae Ball & Tran, 1979
- Spathula foeni Ball, 1977
- Spathula fontinalis (Nurse, 1950)
- Spathula gourbaultae Ball, 1977
- Spathula limicola (Nurse, 1950)
- Spathula miserabile Sluys & Grant, 2006
- Spathula musculosa Sluys & Grant, 2006
- Spathula neara Ball, 1977
- Spathula ochyra Ball & Tran, 1979
- Spathula schauinslandi (Neppi, 1904)
- Spathula simplex Sluys & Grant, 2006
- Spathula truculenta Ball, 1977
- Spathula trunculata Ball, 1977
- Spathula tryssa Ball, 1977
