= Dugesia afromontana =

Scientific classification
- Kingdom: Animalia
- Phylum: Platyhelminthes
- Order: Tricladida
- Family: Dugesiidae
- Genus: Dugesia
- Species: D. afromontana

Binomial name
- Dugesia afromontana Stocchino & Sluys, 2012

Species of flatworm

Dugesia afromontana is a species of dugesiid triclad found in the Amatola Mountains, Eastern Cape, South Africa.

== Etymology ==
The specific epithet is derived from the Afromontane, being found within the region in South Africa in the Amathole Mountains.

== Description ==
Dugesia afromontana ranges from 18–20 mm in length and 2–2.5 mm in width. Two eyes are in the middle of the head, with auricular grooves on the sides of the head just below eye-level. The backside is a brown color, and the underside is pale.
