= Dugesia tubqalis =

Scientific classification
- Domain: Eukaryota
- Kingdom: Animalia
- Phylum: Platyhelminthes
- Order: Tricladida
- Family: Dugesiidae
- Genus: Dugesia
- Species: D. tubqalis

Binomial name
- Dugesia tubqalis Harrath & Sluys, 2012

Species of flatworm

Dugesia tubqalis is a species of dugesiid triclad that inhabits springs of Morocco. It is named after the Toubkal peak (Tubqal in Berber), the highest in the Atlas Mountains. It has been found between 1,702 and 2,164 m of altitude.

== Description ==
Living animals measure up to 20 millimetres (0.79 in) in length and 3 millimetres (0.12 in) in width. They have a pigmented dorsal surface, and a paler ventral surface. The head is triangle-shaped with two eyes in pigment free-patches.
