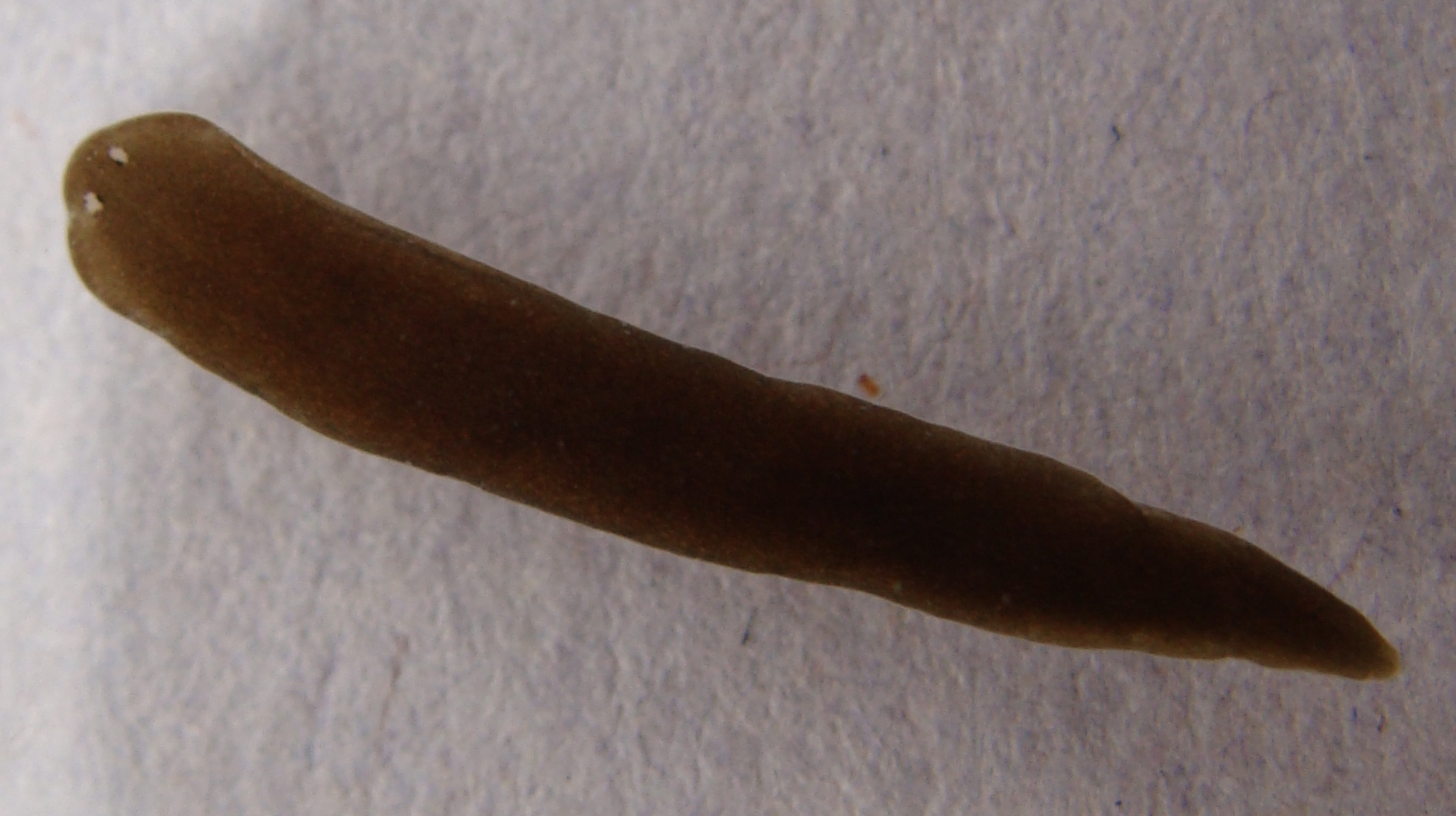

Scientific classification
- Kingdom: Animalia
- Phylum: Platyhelminthes
- Order: Tricladida
- Family: Dugesiidae
- Genus: Schmidtea
- Species: S. polychroa

Binomial name
- Schmidtea polychroa (Schmidt, 1861)

Synonyms
- Dugesia (Schmidtea) polychroa (Schmidt, 1861); Dugesia polychroa (Schmidt, 1861); Euplanaria polychroa (Schmidt, 1861); Planaria polychroa Schmidt, 1861

= Schmidtea polychroa =

Species of flatworm

Schmidtea polychroa is a species of freshwater flatworm, a dugesiid triclad that inhabits the shallow mesotrophic or eutrophic waters of rivers and lakes of Europe. It is also present in North America, where it has been introduced at least in the St. Lawrence River system. It is an animal with a limited dispersion capability.

== Description ==
S. polychroa has a rounded head and a pointed back end with relatively no constriction. There are two eyes. While the color is generally brown, it can range from dark brown to black, and specimens of a black-green color and even with piebald-like patterns have been observed.

== Diet ==
Individuals of this species search for food actively. They feed mainly on small invertebrates, and show a preference for oligochaetes and gastropods. However, they can also feed on the carcasses of large animals, such as dead frogs.

== Reproduction ==
They are hermaphroditic. Schmidtea polychroa produces cocoons in water temperatures between 10 and 23 °C.
