= Neppia =

Scientific classification
- Kingdom: Animalia
- Phylum: Platyhelminthes
- Order: Tricladida
- Family: Dugesiidae
- Genus: Neppia; Ball, 1974

Species
- see text

Genus of flatworms

Neppia is a genus of dugesiid triclad that is found in South America, Subantarctic region, Africa, Tasmania and New Zealand.

Until 1974 Neppia was considered a subgenus of Dugesia.

== Phylogeny and taxonomy ==
Phylogenetic tree including five dugesiid genera after Álvarez-Presas et al., 2008:

- Dugesiidae
  - Girardia
  - - Neppia
    - - Cura
      - - Schmidtea
        - Dugesia

=== Species ===
- Neppia evelinae (Marcus, 1955)
- Neppia falklandica (Westblad, 1952)
- Neppia jeanneli (Beauchamp, 1913)
- Neppia magnibursalis Sluys & Kawakatsu, 2001
- Neppia montana (Nurse, 1950)
- Neppia paeta (Marcus, 1955)
- Neppia tinga (Marcus, 1955)
- Neppia wimbimba (Marcus, 1970)
