= Scardinius plotizza =

Conservation status
- Near Threatened (IUCN 3.1)

Scientific classification
- Kingdom: Animalia
- Phylum: Chordata
- Class: Actinopterygii
- Order: Cypriniformes
- Family: Leuciscidae
- Subfamily: Leuciscinae
- Genus: Scardinius
- Species: S. plotizza

Binomial name
- Scardinius plotizza Heckel & Kner, 1858

Species of fish

Scardinius plotizza, the Neretva rudd, is a species of freshwater ray-finned fish belonging to the family Leuciscidae, which includes the daces, Eurasian minnows and related fishes. This species is endemic to the Western Balkans.

== Taxonomy ==
Scardinius plotizza was first formally described in 1858 by the Austrian ichthyologists Johann Jakob Heckel and Rudolf Kner with its type locality given as Jessero Grande near Vrgorac and Imotski, Croatia; and Livno in Bosnia-Herzegovina. This species was formerly considered to be a synonym of the common rudd (S. erythrophthalmus). The Neretva rudd belongs to the genus Scardinius, commonly referred to as rudds, which belongs to the subfamily Leuciscinae of the family Leuciscidae.

== Etymology ==
Scardinius plotizza belongs to the genus Scardinius and this name is thought to be a latinisation of scardafa, a vernacular name in Italy, Rome in particular, for the Tiber rudd (Scardinius scardafa). The Specific name, plotizza, is a vernacular name for this fish Croatia and Bosnia-Herzegovina, and may be one applied to all "whitefish", "Weissfische" in the German of Heckel and Kner.

== Description ==
Scardinius plotizza may be told apart from other European rudd species by having between 37 and 40 scales along the lateral line; the anal fin has 9 1/2 branched fin rays; 11-14 gill rakers; the dorsal profile of the head is straight, snout pointing forward, tip above the level of the middle of the eye; there is no hump behind the eye; the eye is not close to the dorsal profile of the head in lateral view; the articulation of lower jaw is under or to the front of the eye; the ventral profile of the head has an obvious angle at the articulation of the lower jaw; the head length is equivalent to 19-31% of the standard length; and all fins dark grey in adults. This species has a maximum standard length of 39 cm (15 in).

== Distribution and habitat ==
Scardinius plotizza is known only from the Neretva drainage system in southern Croatia and Bosnia Herzegovina. The Neretva rudd prefers slow moving or still water in spring-fed karstic river systems, lakes and associated temporary wetlands.

== Conservation ==
Scardinius plotizza is classified as Near Threatened by the International Union for Conservation of Nature. The threats to this species include water abstraction, pollution, damming and canalisation and invasive species.
