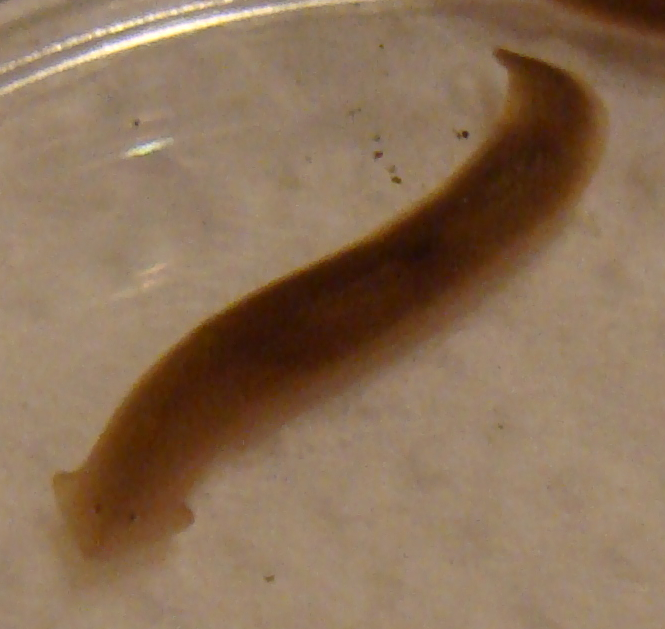

Scientific classification
- Domain: Eukaryota
- Kingdom: Animalia
- Phylum: Platyhelminthes
- Order: Tricladida
- Family: Dugesiidae
- Genus: Dugesia
- Species: D. arcadia

Binomial name
- Dugesia arcadia de Vries, 1988

= Dugesia arcadia =

Species of flatworm

Dugesia arcadia is a species of freshwater dugesiid found in northern Peloponnese, Greece.

The specific name "arcadia" refers to the district Arcadia, on the Peloponnese.
