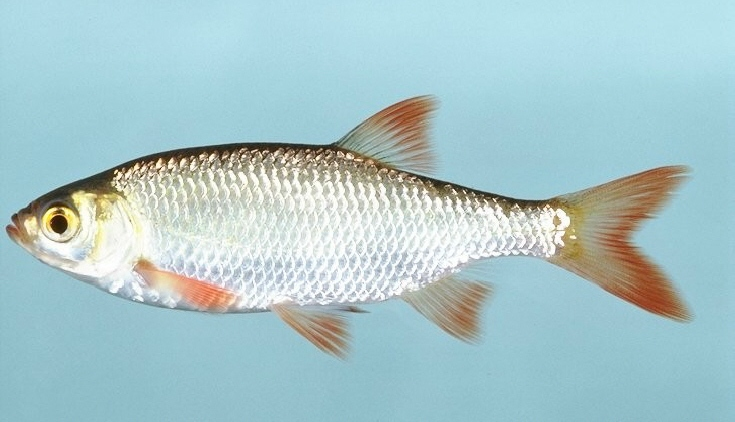
- Common rudd (Scardinius erythrophthalmus)

Scientific classification
- Kingdom: Animalia
- Phylum: Chordata
- Class: Actinopterygii
- Division: Teleostei
- Order: Cypriniformes
- Family: Leuciscidae
- Subfamily: Leuciscinae
- Genus: Scardinius; Bonaparte, 1837

Type species
- Leuciscus scardafa Bonaparte, 1837

Synonyms
- Heegerius Bonaparte, 1845

= Scardinius =

Genus of fishes

Scardinius is a genus of freshwater ray-finned fishes belonging to the family Leuciscidae, which includes daces, Eurasian minnows, and related species. The fishes in this genus are commonly called rudds. Locally, the name "rudd" without any further qualifiers is also used for individual species, particularly the common rudd (S. erythrophthalmus). The rudd can be distinguished from the very similar roach by its upturned mouth, allowing it to pick food items such as aquatic insects from the surface of the water with minimal disturbance.

The Greek rudd (S. graecus) is a similar fish which grows up to 40 cm long. It occurs only in the southern tip of the Greek mainland. It lives in lakes and slow-flowing rivers, forming large schools. It spawns around April–June among underwater plants in shallow water. It feeds on small crustaceans, the larvae and pupae of insects, and on plant material. The majority of its food is taken at or near the surface of the water. The fish is not usually found in deep water. Very little is known about the biology of this species. It is important locally, both to anglers and commercial companies.

== Species ==
- Scardinius acarnanicus Economidis, 1991 (Trichonis rudd)
- Scardinius dergle Heckel & Kner, 1858 (Dalmatian rudd)
- Scardinius elmaliensis Bogutskaya, 1997 (Elmali rudd)
- Scardinius erythrophthalmus (Linnaeus, 1758) (common rudd)
- Scardinius graecus Stephanidis, 1937 (Greek rudd)
- Scardinius hesperidicus Bonaparte, 1845 (Italian rudd)
- Scardinius knezevici Bianco & Kottelat, 2005 (Skadar rudd)
- Scardinius plotizza Heckel & Kner, 1858 (Neretva rudd)
- Scardinius racovitzai G. J. Müller, 1958 (Racovitza's rudd)
- Scardinius scardafa (Bonaparte, 1837) (Tiber rudd)
