= Schmidtea lugubris =

Scientific classification
- Kingdom: Animalia
- Phylum: Platyhelminthes
- Order: Tricladida
- Family: Dugesiidae
- Genus: Schmidtea
- Species: S. lugubris

Binomial name
- Schmidtea lugubris (Schmidt, 1861)

Synonyms
- Dugesia lugubris Schmidt, 1861; Dugesia lugubris (Schmidt, 1861); Euplanaria lugubris (Schmidt, 1861)

Species of flatworm

Schmidtea lugubris is a species of freshwater flatworm, a dugesiid triclad found in Europe.

== Description ==
S. lugubris is slender in shape. The head is blunt and rounded at full growth, but medium-sized individuals have lateral lobes forming a triangular shape. There are two eyes. The auricles of the head are a translucent grey color, but the rest of the backside is a dark brown.

== Diet ==
S. lugubris preys mainly on oligochaetes and gastropods.
