= Reynoldsonia =

Romankenkius patagonicus

Scientific classification
- Kingdom: Animalia
- Phylum: Platyhelminthes
- Order: Tricladida
- Family: Dugesiidae
- Genus: Reynoldsonia; Ball, 1974
- Species: R. reynoldsonia

Binomial name
- Reynoldsonia reynoldsonia Ball, 1974

Species of flatworm

Reynoldsonia reynoldsonia is a freshwater dugesiidae triclad found in Australia. It is the only species in the genus Reynoldsonia. It was named in honor of Professor Trefor B. Reynoldson.
