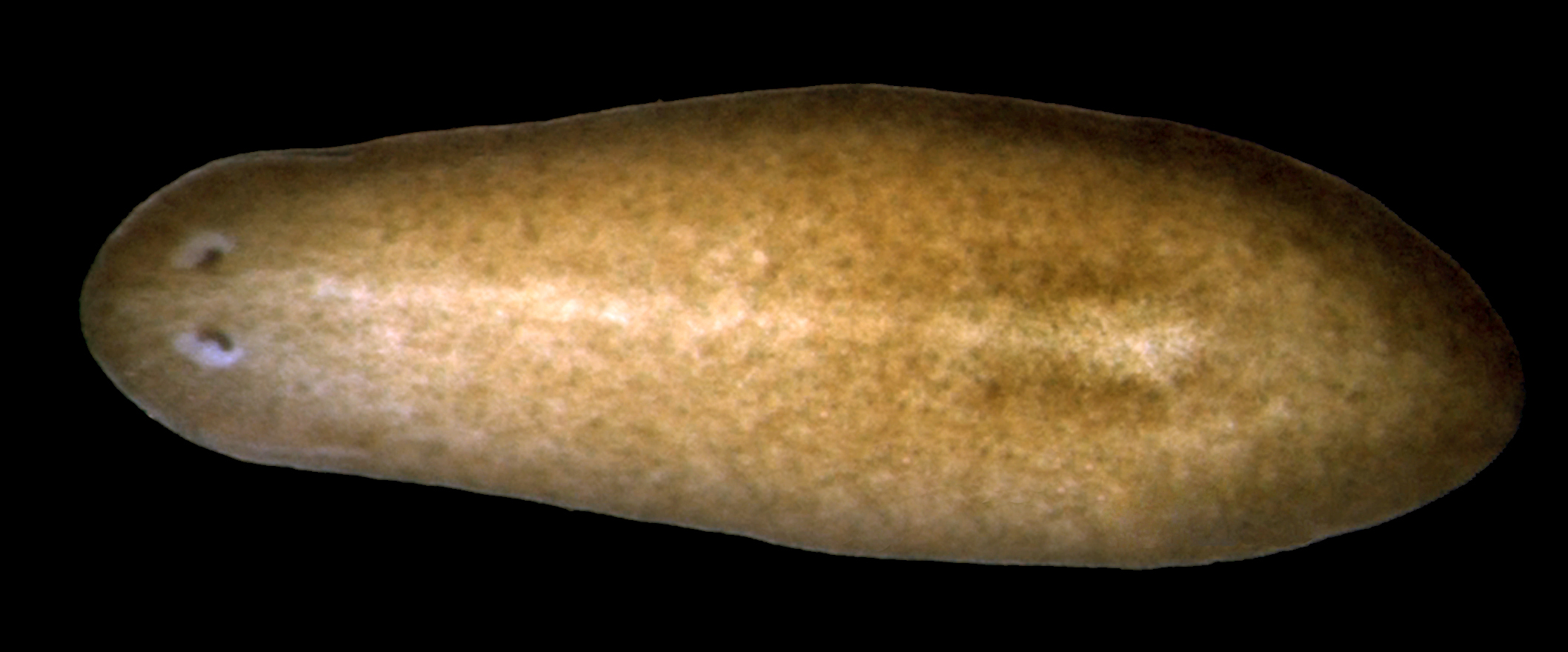
- Schmidtea mediterranea

Scientific classification
- Kingdom: Animalia
- Phylum: Platyhelminthes
- Order: Tricladida
- Family: Dugesiidae
- Genus: Schmidtea; Ball, 1974

Species
- Schmidtea lugubris; Schmidtea mediterranea; Schmidtea nova; Schmidtea polychroa

= Schmidtea =

Genus of flatworms

Schmidtea is a genus of freshwater triclads. Species of the genus Schmidtea are widely used in regeneration and developmental studies.

Until 1991, Schmidtea was considered as a subgenus of Dugesia, then it was elevated to the genus rank.

== Etymology ==
The genus was presumably named after Eduard Oscar Schmidt, who described two species within the genus.

== Phylogeny ==
Phylogenetic tree including five dugesiid genera after Álvarez-Presas et al., 2008:

- Dugesiidae
  - Girardia
  - - Neppia
    - - Cura
      - - Schmidtea
        - Dugesia
