= Scardinius elmaliensis =

Conservation status
- Endangered (IUCN 3.1)

Scientific classification
- Kingdom: Animalia
- Phylum: Chordata
- Class: Actinopterygii
- Order: Cypriniformes
- Family: Leuciscidae
- Subfamily: Leuciscinae
- Genus: Scardinius
- Species: S. elmaliensis

Binomial name
- Scardinius elmaliensis Bogutskaya, 1997

Species of fish

Scardinius elmaliensis, the Elmali rudd, is a species of freshwater ray-finned fish belonging to the family Leuciscidae, which includes the daces, Eurasian minnows and related fishes. This species is endemic to Turkey. Its natural habitats are rivers and freshwater lakes.
