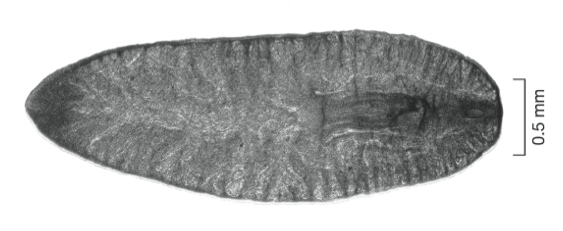
- Dorsal view

Scientific classification
- Kingdom: Animalia
- Phylum: Platyhelminthes
- Order: Tricladida
- Family: Dugesiidae
- Genus: Weissius; Sluys, 2007
- Species: W. capaciductus

Binomial name
- Weissius capaciductus Sluys, 2007

= Weissius =

Weissius capaciductus

Species of flatworm

Weissius capaciductus is a species of dugesiid triclad found in Australia. It is the only species in the monotypic genus Weissius.

== Etymology ==
The genus was named for Annie Weiss, a planarian worker, in honor of her contributions to knowledge of Australian freshwater planarians. The specific epithet is derived from Latin, meaning "spacious duct" (capax + ductus), in reference to the expanded anterior section of the species' oviducts.

== Description ==
W. capaciductus is about five millimeters long and one millimeter wide. The base color is light with speckled darker brown pigment, concentrated around the pharynx. The underside is pale. The head and tail are round and broad. The species lacks eyes.
