= Bopsula =

Bopsula evelinae

Scientific classification
- Kingdom: Animalia
- Phylum: Platyhelminthes
- Order: Tricladida
- Family: Dugesiidae
- Genus: Bopsula; Marcus, 1946
- Species: B. evelinae

Binomial name
- Bopsula evelinae Marcus, 1946

Genus of flatworms

Bopsula evelinae is a species of dugesiid triclad, the only one in the genus Bopsula. This species is found in Brazil.
