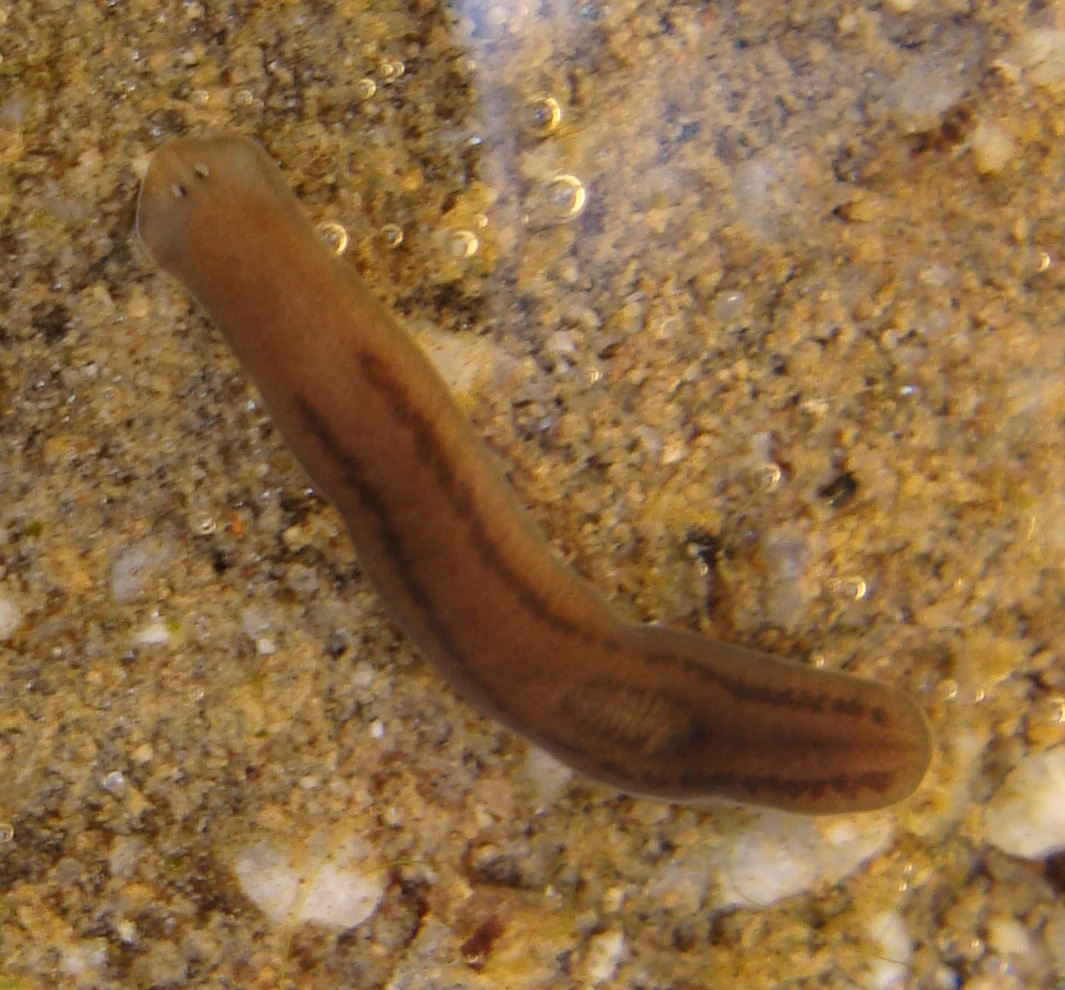
- Recurva sp. from Paros, Greece

Scientific classification
- Kingdom: Animalia
- Phylum: Platyhelminthes
- Order: Tricladida
- Family: Dugesiidae
- Genus: Recurva; Sluys, 2013

Species
- R. conjuncta; R. postrema; Recurva sp. (Paros island)

= Recurva =

Genus of flatworms

Recurva is a genus of freshwater and free-living triclad platyhelminth that belongs to the Dugesiidae family. It contains two known species although, according to molecular evidences, there is probably a third one.

== Distribution ==
Described species of Recurva are found on different Greek islands. R. postrema inhabits the island of Rhodes and R. conjuncta the island of Cephalonia. The third putative species is found on Paros.
