= Eviella =

Eviella hynesae

Scientific classification
- Kingdom: Animalia
- Phylum: Platyhelminthes
- Order: Tricladida
- Family: Dugesiidae
- Genus: Eviella; Ball, 1977
- Species: E. hynesae

Binomial name
- Eviella hynesae Ball, 1977

Genus of flatworms

Eviella hynesae is a species of dugesiid triclad, and is the only species in the monotypic genus Eviella.
