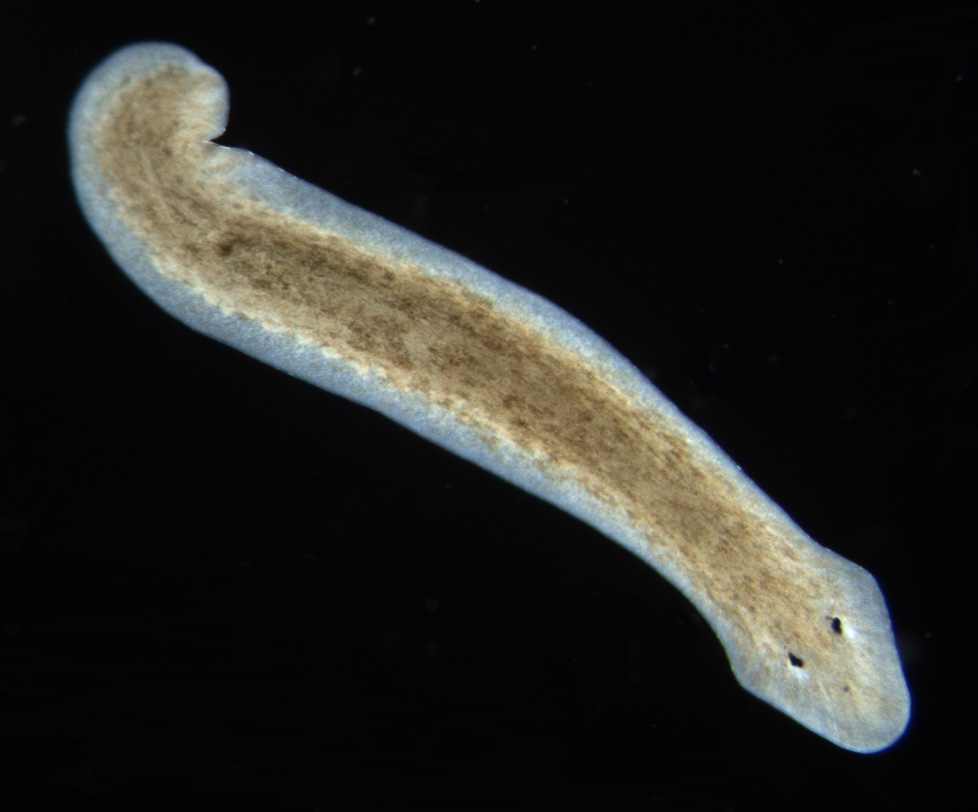
- Dugesia subtentaculata

Scientific classification
- Kingdom: Animalia
- Phylum: Platyhelminthes
- Order: Tricladida
- Family: Dugesiidae
- Genus: Dugesia; Girard, 1850

Species
- See text
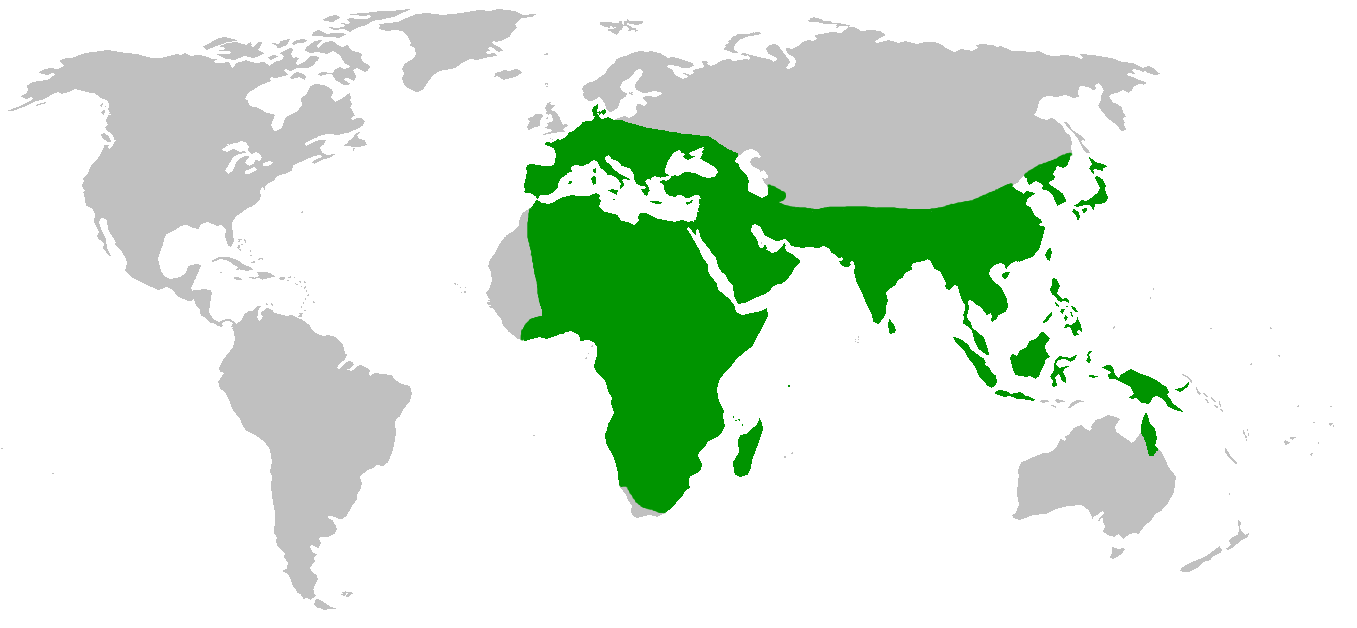
- Distribution of genus Dugesia after Sluys et al. 1998.

Synonyms
- Euplanaria Hesse, 1897; Geopaludicola Komarek, 1919

= Dugesia =

Genus of flatworms

Dugesia is a genus of freshwater planarians in the family Dugesiidae triclads and the type genus of this family. These common flatworms are found in freshwater habitats of Africa, Eurasia, and Australia. Dugesia is best known to non-specialists because of its regeneration capacities.

== Description ==
Dugesia species have an elongated body with a slightly triangle-shaped head. They often have grey, brown, or black dorsal color, whereas the ventral surface is usually paler. These animals have a couple of eyes constituted by a multicellular pigmented cup with many retinal cells to detect the amount of light in the nearby environment. Sometimes they present supernumerary eyes. At the anterior part of the body, behind the eye level, they have a pair of structures called auricles that give the triangle look to the 'head' and allow them to detect the intensity of water current. These auricles are free of pigment and rhabdites. Each side of the anterior margin of the head has between 5 and 10 shallow sensory fossae, their number depending on the species or the individual. The sensory fossae and the auricle grooves are supplied with many nerve endings.

The digestive system of Dugesia contains a central, non-pigmented tubular pharynx. Like the other triclads, the gut consists of three branches, one anterior and two posterior. Each branch consists of caeca, which deliver the nutrients to the body. The gut lacks a separate opening for waste excretion.

The subepidermal musculature of Dugesia is divided into four layers.

In Dugesia the ovaries are ventrally situated, they start just behind the brain, usually at the level of the fourth intestinal branch. The bursal canal runs on the right side of the copulatory apparatus and above the atrium. Like some Neppia species, species of Dugesia have a third layer of longitudinal musculature over the vaginal area of the bursal canal. This feature is not present in other triclads. Another feature shared with Neppia is the presence of a glandular area at the transitional area between the seminal vesicle and the ejaculatory duct, although in Dugesia these glands are concentrated at the diaphragm, a structure not present in any other genera. Ball proposed that the presence of this glands was a synapomorphy of Dugesia and Neppia. The absence of these glands in some Neppia species (N. jeanneli, N. montana and N. schubarti) is thought to be a secondary loss.

== Reproduction ==
Species of Dugesia are hermaphrodites. Many species can reproduce both sexually and asexually (by parthenogenesis or by fission).

== Phylogeny and taxonomy ==
Dugesia species lack enough morphological characters to recover the phylogenetic relation between them. The few available characters often contradict each other when a morphological phylogeny is attempted. Dugesia species are identified by the combination of diagnostic characters instead of different apomorphies. Over 130 species within the genus Dugesia have been described.

=== Phylogeny ===
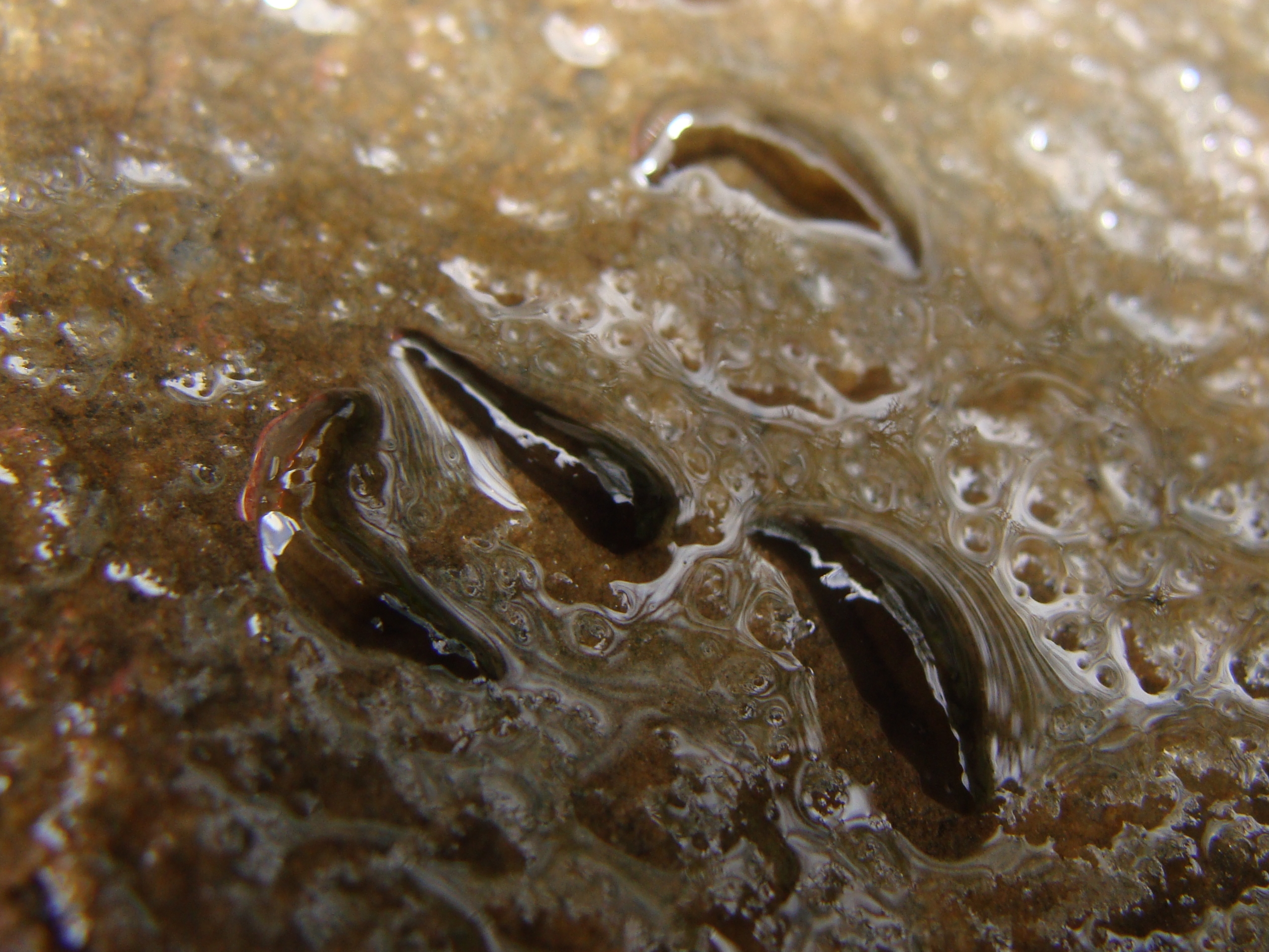
Dugesia cretica under a stone of a Cretan stream.

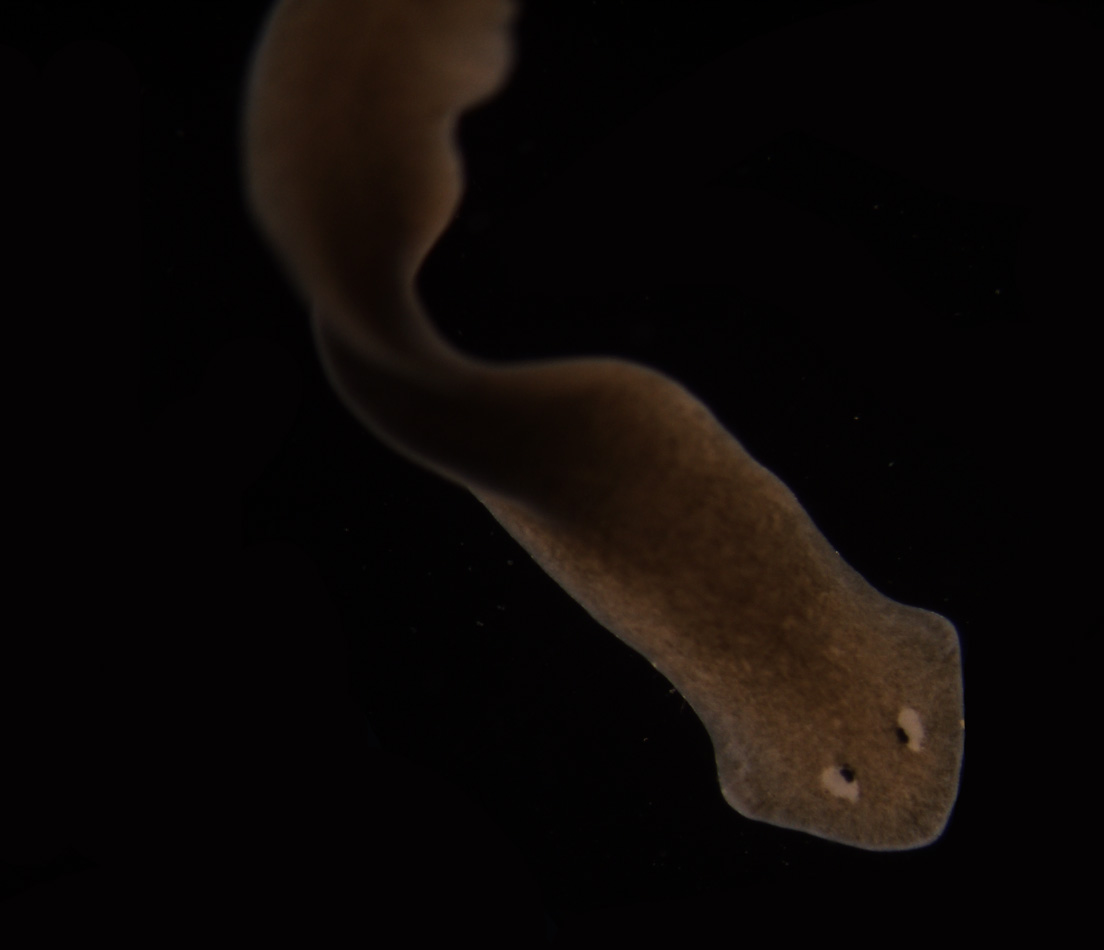
Dugesia sp. related to Dugesia liguriensis from Catalonia.

Phylogenetic tree including five dugesiid genera after Álvarez-Presas et al., 2008:

- Dugesiidae
  - Girardia
  - - Neppia
    - - Cura
      - - Schmidtea
        - Dugesia

Molecular phylogeny of 13 Dugesia species after Lázaro et al., 2009:

- Dugesia
  - - D. sicula
    - D. aethiopica
  - - - - D. japonica
        - - D. ryukyuensis
          - - D. notogaea
            - D. bengalensis
    - - D. subtentaculata
      - - D. gonocephala
        - - D. liguriensis
          - - D. etrusca
            - D. ilvana
      - - D. benazzii
        - D. hepta

Molecular phylogeny of Dugesia species after Solà et al., 2013:

- Dugesia
  - - D. aethiopica
    - D. sicula
  - - - - D. etrusca
        - D. ilvana
      - - D. gonocephala
        - - D. benazzii
          - D. hepta
    - - D. cretica
      - - - - D. elegans
            - - D. damoae
              - D. effusa
          - - D. improvisa
            - D. ariadnae
        - - D. arcadia
          - - D. malickyi
            - - D. aenigma
              - - D. sagitta
                - D. parasagitta

=== Species ===
The following species are currently recognised in the genus Dugesia:

- Dugesia absoloni (Komarek, 1919)
- Dugesia aconcinna Chen & Dong, 2025
- Dugesia adunca Chen & Sluys, 2022
- Dugesia aenigma De Vries, 1984
- Dugesia aethiopica Stocchino, Corso, Manconi & Pala, 2002
- Dugesia afromontana Stocchino & Sluys, 2012
- Dugesia ancoraria Zhu & Wang, 2024
- Dugesia andamanensis (Kaburaki, 1925)
- Dugesia annandalei (Kaburaki, 1918)
- Dugesia arabica Harrath & Sluys, 2013
- Dugesia arcadia De Vries, 1988
- Dugesia ariadnae De Vries, 1984
- Dugesia artesiana Sluys & Grant, 2007
- Dugesia astrocheta Marcus, 1953
- Dugesia aurea Leria, 2020
- Dugesia austroasiatica Kawakatsu, 1985
- Dugesia bactriana de Beauchamp, 1959
- Dugesia bakurianica Porfirieva, 1958
- Dugesia batuensis Ball, 1970
- Dugesia benazzii Lepori, 1951
- Dugesia bengalensis Kawakatsu, 1983
- Dugesia biblica Benazzi & Banchetti, 1973
- Dugesia bifida Stocchino & Sluys, 2014
- Dugesia bijuga Harrath & Sluys, 2019
- Dugesia borneana Kawakatsu, 1972
- Dugesia brachycephala (Bohmig, 1897)
- Dugesia brigantii De Vries & Benazzi, 1983
- Dugesia burmaensis (Kaburaki, 1918)
- Dugesia bursagrossa Harrath & Sluys, 2025
- Dugesia capensis Sluys, 2007
- Dugesia chichkovi (Hranova, 1929)
- Dugesia circumcisa Chen & Dong, 2021
- Dugesia constrictiva Chen & Dong, 2022
- Dugesia corbata Leria, 2020
- Dugesia crassimentula Sluys & Stocchino, 2024
- Dugesia cretica (Meixner, 1928)
- Dugesia damoae De Vries, 1984
- Dugesia debeauchampi De Vries, 1988
- Dugesia deharvengi Kawakatsu & Mitchell, 1989
- Dugesia didiaphragma De Vries, 1988
- Dugesia dubia (Borelli, 1895)
- Dugesia ectophysa Marcus, 1953
- Dugesia effusa Sluys, 2013
- Dugesia elegans De Vries, 1984
- Dugesia etrusca Benazzi, 1944
- Dugesia fissipara (Kennel, 1888)
- Dugesia foeni Ball, 1977
- Dugesia fontinalis (Nurse, 1950)
- Dugesia gemmulata Sun & Wang, 2022
- Dugesia golanica Bromley & Benazzi, 1991
- Dugesia gonocephala (Duges, 1830)
- Dugesia gonocephaloides Girard, 1850
- Dugesia hepta Pala, Casu & Vacca, 1981
- Dugesia hoernesi (Weiss, 1909)
- Dugesia hoidi Dols-Serrate, Stocchino & Riutort, 2024
- Dugesia hymanae (Sivickis, 1928)
- Dugesia iheringii (Bohmig, 1887)
- Dugesia ilvana Lepori, 1948
- Dugesia improvisa Sluys & Solà, 2013
- Dugesia indica Kawakatsu, 1969
- Dugesia indonesiana Kawakatsu, 1973
- Dugesia insolita Stocchino & Sluys, 2024
- Dugesia iranica Livanov, 1951
- Dugesia izuensis Kato, 1943
- Dugesia japonica Ichikawa & Kawakatsu, 1964
- Dugesia krishnaswamyi Kawakatsu, 1975
- Dugesia lamottei de Beauchamp, 1952
- Dugesia lanzai Banchetti & del Papa, 1972
- Dugesia lata (Sivickis, 1923)
- Dugesia laurentiana (Borelli, 1897)
- Dugesia leclerci Kawakatsu & Mitchel, 1995
- Dugesia leporii Pala, Stocchino, Corso & Casu, 2000
- Dugesia libanica Bromley & Benazzi, 1991
- Dugesia liguriensis De Vries, 1988
- Dugesia lindbergi de Beauchamp, 1959
- Dugesia machadoi de Beauchamp, 1952
- Dugesia maculata (Leidy, 1847)
- Dugesia maghrebiana Stocchino, Manconi, Corso, Sluys, Casu & Pala, 2009
- Dugesia majuscula Chen & Dong, 2021
- Dugesia malickyi De Vries, 1984
- Dugesia mariae Stocchino, Dols-Serrate & Riutort, 2024
- Dugesia mertoni (Steinmann, 1914)
- Dugesia michaelsoni (Bohmig, 1902)
- Dugesia microbursalis (Hyman, 1931)
- Dugesia milloti Beauchamp, 1952
- Dugesia minotauros De Vries, 1984
- Dugesia mirabilis De Vries, 1988
- Dugesia modesta Girard, 1893
- Dugesia monomyoda Marcus, 1953
- Dugesia montana Nurse, 1950
- Dugesia musculosa Chen & Dong, 2024
- Dugesia myopa De Vries, 1988
- Dugesia naiadis Sluys, 2013
- Dugesia nannophallus Ball, 1970
- Dugesia nansheae De Vries, 1988
- Dugesia neumanni (Neppi, 1904)
- Dugesia nonatoi Marcus, 1946
- Dugesia notogaea Sluys & Kawakatsu, 1998
- Dugesia novaguineana Kawakatsu, 1976
- Dugesia parasagitta Sluys & Solà, 2013
- Dugesia patula Chen & Dong, 2025
- Dugesia pendula Chen & Dong, 2024
- Dugesia polyorchis (Fuhrmann, 1912)
- Dugesia postica Chen & Dong, 2025
- Dugesia precaucasica Porfirieva, 1958
- Dugesia pustulata Harrath & Sluys, 2019
- Dugesia rincona Marcus, 1954
- Dugesia ryukyuensis Kawakatsu, 1976
- Dugesia saccaria A-T. Wang & Sluys, 2024
- Dugesia sacatta Chen & Dong, 2025
- Dugesia sagitta (Schmidt, 1861)
- Dugesia schauinslandi (Neppi, 1904)
- Dugesia seclusa (de Beauchamp, 1940)
- Dugesia semiglobosa Chen & Dong, 2021
- Dugesia siamana Kawakatsu, 1980
- Dugesia sicula Lepori, 1948
- Dugesia similis (Bohmig, 1902)
- Dugesia sinensis Chen & Wang, 2015
- Dugesia subtentaculata (Draparnaud, 1801)
- Dugesia superioris Stocchino & Sluys, 2013
- Dugesia tamilensis Kawakatsu, 1980
- Dugesia tanganyikae (Laidlaw, 1906)
- Dugesia taurocaucasica (Livanov, 1951)
- Dugesia transcaucasica (Livanov, 1951)
- Dugesia tubqalis Harrath & Sluys, 2012
- Dugesia tumida Chen & Sluys, 2022
- Dugesia uenorum Kawakatsu & Mitchel, 1995
- Dugesia umbonata Song & Wang, 2020
- Dugesia venusta (Bohmig, 1897)
- Dugesia verrucula Chen & Dong, 2021)
- Dugesia vestibularis De Vries, 1988
- Dugesia wytegrensis (Sabussow, 1907)
- Dugesia xeropotamica Stocchino, Dols-Serrate & Riutort, 2024
