= Eyvallah =

Eyvallah is a Turkish and Persian phrase with Arabic origin similar to OK. It is also a Turkish way of greeting others by putting your right hand on your chest. It may also refer to:

- Eyvallah (Işın Karaca album), album by Turkish singer Işın Karaca
- "Eyvallah", 1997 song by İzel from her album Emanet
- "Eyvallah", 1998 song by Turkish singer Emrah İpek from his album Dura Dura
- "Eyvallah", 1998 song by Turkish singer Gülşen from her album Erkeksen
- "Eyvallah", 2013 song by the Turkish band Duman during the Gezi Park protests in Istanbul
- "Eyvallah", 2018 song by Turkish singer Resul Dindar

== See also ==
- "Evala" (meaning Eyvallah), a song in Bulgarian and Turkish by Bulgarian singer Azis
