= Tokio Kaburaki =

Japanese zoologist and academic (1890–1968)

Tokio Kaburagi
- 鏑木 外岐雄
- Born: 10 June 1890; Ishikawa Prefecture, Japan
- Died: 21 February 1968 (aged 77)
- Education: University of Tokyo
- Known for: Research on flatworms and plant protection
- Scientific career
- Fields: Zoology, applied biology, applied entomology
- Workplaces: University of Tokyo; Kokugakuin University; Utsunomiya University; Tokugawa Institute for Biological Research

Tokio Kaburagi (鏑木 外岐雄, Kaburagi Tokio; 10 June 1890 – 21 February 1968) was a Japanese zoologist and academic. He conducted research in zoology, applied biology and applied entomology, and served as president of Utsunomiya University and the Japanese Society of Applied Entomology and Zoology.

== Biography ==
=== Early life and education ===
Kaburagi was born in Ishikawa Prefecture, Japan, on 10 June 1890. He studied at the College of Science of Tokyo Imperial University (now the University of Tokyo), graduating in 1915. Following his graduation, he returned to his alma mater and began an academic career.

=== Academic career and research ===
In 1917, Kaburagi became an assistant at Tokyo Imperial University. In 1924, he was appointed lecturer in the university's Faculty of Agriculture and received a Doctor of Science degree. He was promoted to professor in 1926.

Kaburagi also worked as a researcher at the Tokugawa Institute for Biological Research. His research included the study of turbellarians, particularly freshwater planarians such as Dugesia japonica, as well as ribbon worms.

His academic work extended to applied biology and applied entomology. He also participated in plant protection and plant quarantine activities in Japan.

Following the Second World War, Kaburagi served as a professor at Kokugakuin University from 1949 to 1967. He retired from the University of Tokyo in 1951 upon reaching the mandatory retirement age and was subsequently appointed professor emeritus.

He later served as president of Utsunomiya University and chairman of the Japan Plant Protection Association. He was also president of the Japanese Society of Applied Entomology and Zoology.

Kaburagi died on 21 February 1968, aged 77.

Assembly seats
| Preceded by Ishii Tei | President of the Japanese Society of Applied Entomology and Zoology; 1950 | Succeeded by Teizo Esaki |
