= Dentitruncus =

Scientific classification
- Domain: Eukaryota
- Kingdom: Animalia
- Phylum: Rotifera
- Class: Palaeacanthocephala
- Order: Echinorhynchida
- Family: Leptorhynchoididae
- Genus: Dentitruncus; Sinzar, 1955

Genus of worms

Dentitruncus is a genus of parasitic worms belonging to the family Illiosentidae.

Species:

- Dentitruncus truttae Sinzar, 1955
