= Evelia =

Evelia is a feminine given name. Notable people with the name include:

- Evelia Farina (born 1941), Argentine sprinter
- María Evelia Marmolejo (born 1958), Colombian radical feminist performance artist
- Evelia Edith Oyhenart (1955-2021), Argentine anthropologist
- Evelia Sandoval Urbán (born 1964), Mexican politician
