= Evelio Calderín =

Cuban baseball player (born 1896)

- Pitcher
- Born: January 25, 1896; Havana, Cuba
- Batted: Right Threw: Right

Negro league baseball debut
- 1917, for the Cuban Stars

Last appearance
- 1924, for the Cuban Stars
- Stats at Baseball Reference

Teams
- Cuban Stars (1917–1919, 1924)

Evelio Calderín (January 25, 1896 – death unknown) was a Cuban professional baseball pitcher in the Negro leagues between 1917 and 1924.

A native of Havana, Cuba, Calderín made his Negro leagues debut in 1917 with the Cuban Stars. He played for the Stars the following two seasons, then returned to the Stars to finish his career in 1924.
