= Scardinius scardafa =

Conservation status
- Critically Endangered (IUCN 3.1)

Scientific classification
- Kingdom: Animalia
- Phylum: Chordata
- Class: Actinopterygii
- Order: Cypriniformes
- Family: Leuciscidae
- Subfamily: Leuciscinae
- Genus: Scardinius
- Species: S. scardafa

Binomial name
- Scardinius scardafa (Bonaparte, 1837)

Synonyms
- Rutilus heegeri Agassiz, 1835; Leuciscus scarpata Bonaparte, 1837; Leuciscus scardafa Bonaparte, 1837; Leuciscus marrochius Costa, 1838; Leuciscus heegeri Bonaparte, 1839; Leuciscus scarpetta Valenciennes, 1844; Heegerius typus Bonaparte, 1845

Species of fish

Scardinius scardafa , the Tiber rudd, is a species of freshwater ray-finned fish belonging to the family Leuciscidae, which includes the daces, Eurasian minnows and related fishes. This species was regarded as endemic to the drainages of western central Italy.

== Taxonomy ==
Scardinius scardafa was first formally described in 1837 by the French art collector and biologist Charles Lucien Bonaparte with its type locality given as the Lakes Nemi, Ronciglione, Bracciano, Fogliano and others, Italy. This species was formerly considered to be a synonym of the common rudd (S. erythrophthalmus). The Tiber rudd belongs to the genus Scardinius, commonly referred to as rudds, which belongs to the subfamily Leuciscinae of the family Leuciscidae.

The Tiber rudd is very similar to the Italian rudd (S. hesperidicus) which is found in the northern Adriatic drainage basin and these two taxa have been treated as conspecific. These two rudds do show meristic and molecular differences and are currently treated as separate valid, albeit closely related species. The sister taxon to these two is the Neretva rudd (S. plotizza).

== Etymology ==
Scardinius scardafa belongs to the genus Scardinius and this name is thought to be a latinisation of scardafa, which is also the specific name of this species, a vernacular name in Italy, Rome in particular, for the Tiber rudd (Scardinius scardafa).

== Description ==
Scardinius scardafa may be told apart from other Mediterranean rudd species by having between 37 and 40 scales along the lateral line; the anal fin has between 9 and 10 1/2 branched fin rays;; 12-14 gill rakers; the ventral profile of the head has no clear angle at the articulation of lower jaw; the depth of the body is equivalent to 31-36% of the standard length; and all fins dark grey. This species has a maximum standard length of 35 cm (14 in).

== Distribution and habitat ==
Scardinius scardafa is endemic to Italy and it is thought that its natural range encompassed the Ligurian and Tyrrhenian Sea in the Italian Peninsula. It is also thought that it has been replaced by introduced Italian rudd. However, these two taxa are very similar, and their status is uncertain and needs further investigation. Some research suggests that there has been no significant artificial movement of rudd between drainage systems in Italy. The only population of Tiber rudd left is in Lake Scanno in Abruzzo, which is outside the native range. The fish in this lake were introduced from the now drained Lake Fucine, where it inhabits the littoral and benthic zones, preferring area close to beds of macrophytes. It is the most abundant fish species in the lake.
