= Dugesia hepta =

Scientific classification
- Domain: Eukaryota
- Kingdom: Animalia
- Phylum: Platyhelminthes
- Order: Tricladida
- Family: Dugesiidae
- Genus: Dugesia
- Species: D. hepta

Binomial name
- Dugesia hepta Pala, Casu, & Vacca, 1981

Species of flatworm

Dugesia hepta is a species of freshwater triclad endemic to Sardinia.
