= Dugesia aethiopica =

Scientific classification
- Domain: Eukaryota
- Kingdom: Animalia
- Phylum: Platyhelminthes
- Order: Tricladida
- Family: Dugesiidae
- Genus: Dugesia
- Species: D. aethiopica

Binomial name
- Dugesia aethiopica Stocchino, Corso, Manconi & Pala, 2002

Species of worm

Dugesia aethiopica is a species of freshwater dugesiid planarian found in Lake Tana in Ethiopia.

== Etymology ==
The specific epithet of aethiopica refers to the type-locality, within the country of Ethiopia.

== Description ==
Dugesia aethiopica is about 20–22 mm long and 2.5–3 mm wide. It has two eyes in the middle of its head, and unpigmented auricular grooves. Its backside is brown, with a paler underside. Pores for the mouth and genitalia are located on the underside.
