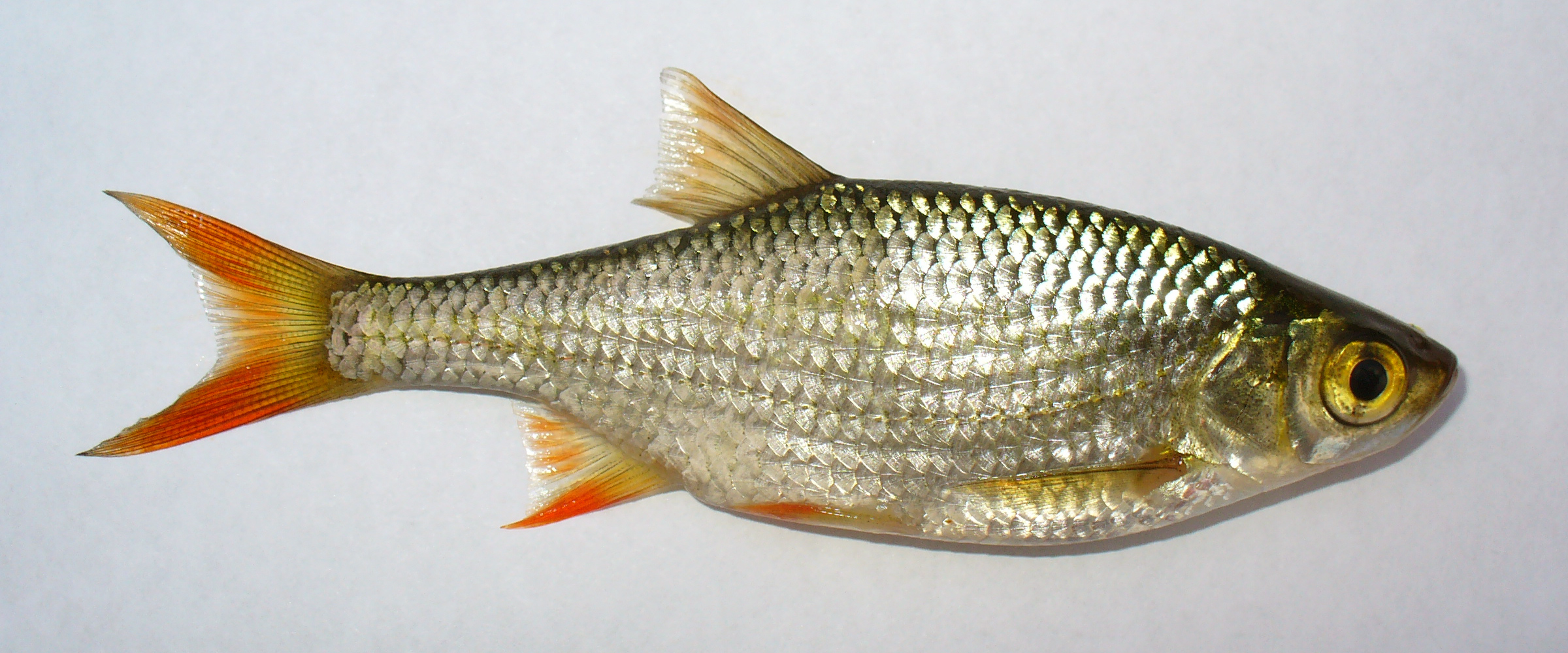

Conservation status
- Least Concern (IUCN 3.1)

Scientific classification
- Kingdom: Animalia
- Phylum: Chordata
- Class: Actinopterygii
- Division: Teleostei
- Order: Cypriniformes
- Family: Leuciscidae
- Subfamily: Leuciscinae
- Genus: Scardinius
- Species: S. erythrophthalmus

Binomial name
- Scardinius erythrophthalmus (Linnaeus, 1758)

Synonyms
- Cyprinus erythrophthalmus Linnaeus, 1758; Leuciscus erythrophthalmus Linnaeus, 1758; Cyprinus erythrops Peter Simon Pallas, 1814; Cyprinus compressus Hollberg, 1822; Cyprinus scardula Nardo, 1827; Cyprinus fuscus Vallot, 1837; Leuciscus caeruleus Yarrell, 1837; Cyprinus caeruleus Yarrell, 1837; Scardinius platizza Johann Jakob Heckel, 1845; Leuciscus apollonitis J.Richardson (naturalist), 1857; Scardinius macrophthalmus Heckel & R.Kner, 1858; Scardinius crocophthalmus Walecki, 1863

= Common rudd =

Species of fish

The common rudd (Scardinius erythrophthalmus) is a bentho-pelagic freshwater ray-finned fish belonging to the family Leuciscidae. This species is widely spread in Europe and central Asia, around the basins of the North, Baltic, Black, Caspian and Aral seas.

== Identification ==
Morphologically, this species is very similar to the roach (Rutilus rutilus), with which it can be easily confused. It can be identified by the yellow eye colour. The eye of the roach has a big red spot above the pupil, that can be more or less conspicuous. The rudd has an upturned mouth allowing it to feed easily at the top of the water. The placement of the dorsal fin is more to the rear which is even visible in very young fish. There are normally only one or two scales between the tip of the pelvic fins and the anal fins, while on the roach there are five. Also the skin of the rudd is yellowish green, while the roach is bluish on the flanks. Also the upturned mouth is visible even in young fish. Furthermore, the rudd's number of soft rays in the dorsal fin (8–9 compared to 10–12). There can be confusion with the ide also, which has smaller scales however.

There is a variety of the common rudd, popular among pond-keepers, known as the golden rudd, which has a gold-coloured body.

The rudd can grow to a size of about 45–50 cm with an average of about 25 cm.

The dorsal fin and pectoral fins are greyish with a reddish tint and all the other fins are bright red. This coloring of the fins is the feature to which the seventeenth century name 'rudd' refers.

== Invasive species and artificial introduction ==
It has been artificially introduced to Ireland, United States, Morocco, Madagascar, Norway, Tunisia, New Zealand, Canada, and Spain.

Rudd have been found in the US states of Alabama, Arkansas, Colorado, Connecticut, Georgia, Illinois, Indiana, Kansas, Massachusetts, Maine, Missouri, Nebraska, New Jersey, New York, Oklahoma, Pennsylvania, South Dakota, Texas, Vermont, Virginia, West Virginia, and Wisconsin. This list may not include all states containing an introduced population of rudd.

Rudd were illegally introduced into New Zealand in the 1960s and have been actively spread around the country. They have the potential to irreversibly damage indigenous ecosystems.

== Possession of rudd in the US ==
Rudd were reported in the United States at least as early as 1925. It is unlawful to possess or transport live specimens in the US state of Tennessee. No person, firm, corporation, partnership nor association shall possess, sell, offer for sale, import, bring, release or cause to be brought or imported into the State of Alabama any species of fish "rudd" (Scardinius erythrophthalmus) or "roach" (Rutilus rutilus) nor any hybrids of either species. This species was reported in Alabama from First Creek in Lauderdale County c. 1987.

== Ecology ==
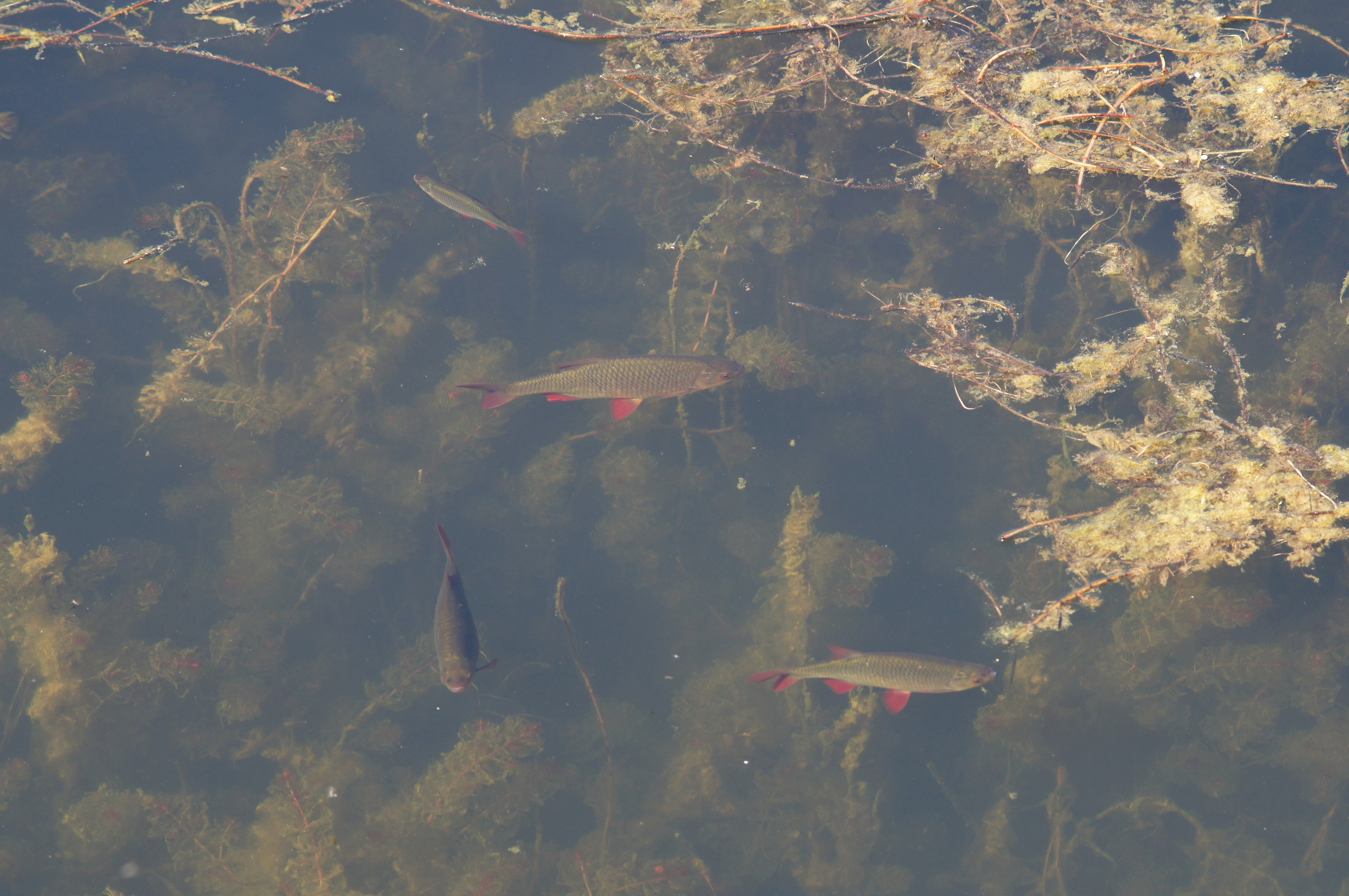
Large rudd in a natural setting

Rudd prefer clear waters rich in plants. They also feed on aquatic vegetation when the temperature exceeds 18 °C. They hunt for living prey in the upper levels. They prefer mesotrophic waters, while the roach is sometimes found together with the perch in waters that are nutrient poor. Rudd appear to prefer non-acidic water.

It prefers shallow weedy areas in lakes and river backwaters, where mature females lay up to 200,000 eggs on submerged vegetation. Young rudd eat zooplankton, aquatic insects, and occasionally other small fish. Mature rudd, which are about 18" in length and weigh about 3 pounds, eat mostly aquatic vegetation. The rudd can consume up to 40% of their body weight in vegetation per day, as much as 80% of which is discharged as waste, releasing nutrients into the water column. They can tolerate a wide range of temperatures and water conditions, including eutrophic or polluted waters. In the laboratory rudd readily hybridize with the U.S. golden shiner (Notemigonus crysoleucas). They come in both silver and gold, and are sometimes sold as pond ornamentals.

Maximum lifespan has been reported as 17 years. Sexual maturity has been reported at 2–3 years.
