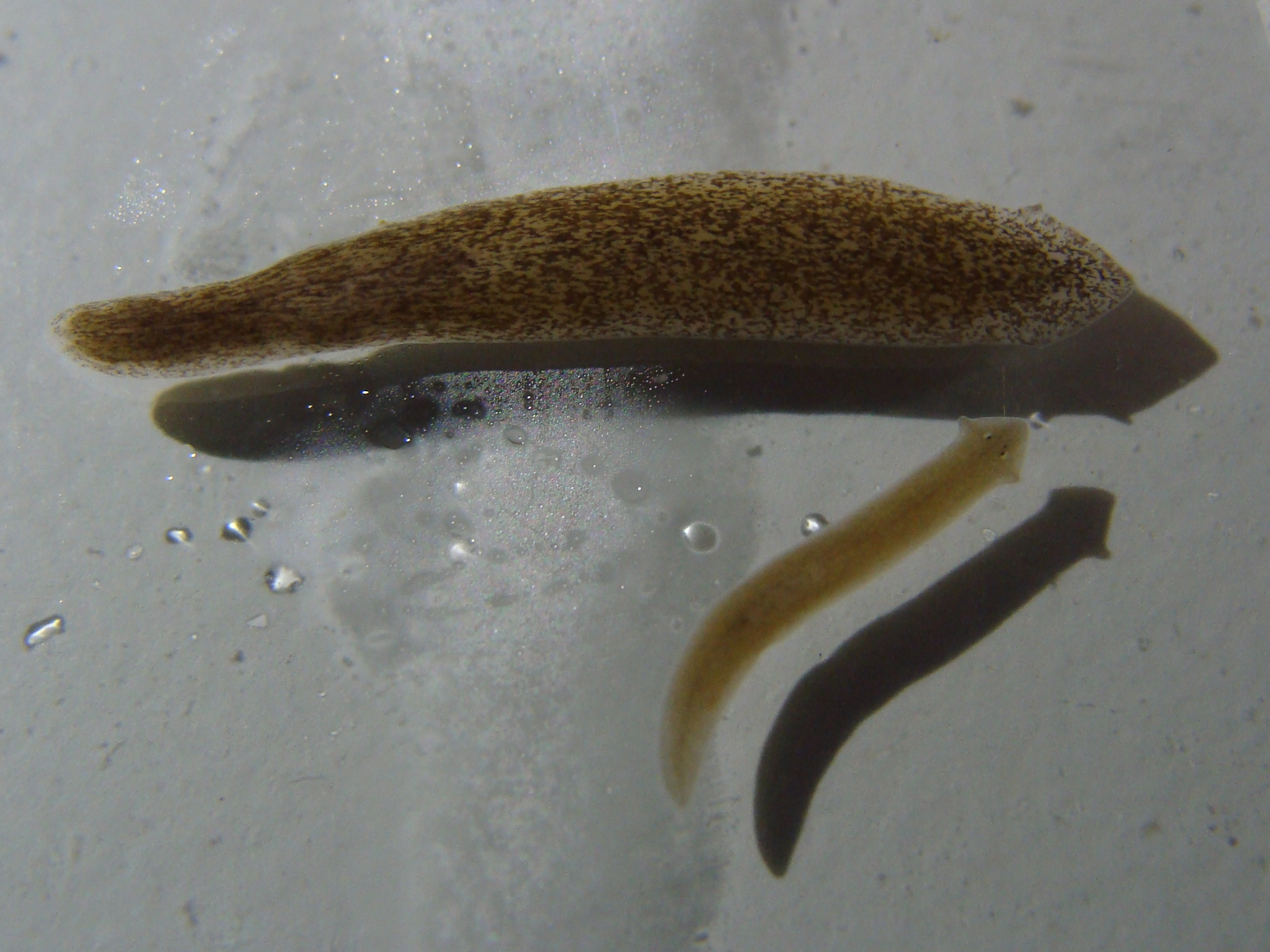
- Girardia sp. (top) and Dugesia sp. (down)

Scientific classification
- Kingdom: Animalia
- Phylum: Platyhelminthes
- Order: Tricladida
- Suborder: Continenticola
- Family: Dugesiidae; Ball, 1974

Type genus
- Dugesia Girard, 1850

Genera
- Bopsula; Cura; Dugesia; Eviella; Girardia; Neppia; Recurva; Reynoldsonia; Romankenkius; Schmidtea; Spathula; Weissius

= Dugesiidae =

Family of flatworms

Dugesiidae is a family of freshwater planarians distributed worldwide (except Antarctica). The type genus is Dugesia Girard, 1850.

== Description ==
All species of Dugesiidae live in freshwater environments and have a dorsoventrally flattened body. The head usually has a somewhat triangular shape and has two eyes (except for some subterranean eyeless species). The main differences between Dugesiidae and other freshwater planarians are related to the anatomy of the eyes and the copulatory apparatus. The eye cup in Dugesiidae is composed of several retinal cells, while in other freshwater planarians they are composed of a single cell.

All freshwater planarians have an accessory organ called copulatory bursa or bursa copulatrix, which is connected to the genital atrium by a canal. In Dugesiidae, the oviducts, which conduct the eggs from the ovaries to the genital atrium, open into the bursal canal, while in other freshwater planarians they open directly into the genital atrium.

== Phylogeny ==
According to molecular analyses, Dugesiidae is the sister group of land planarians.

Phylogenetic supertree including all major triclad groups after Sluys et al., 2009:

- Tricladida
  - Maricola
  - - Cavernicola
    - Continenticola
      - Planarioidea
        - Planariidae
        - - Kenkiidae
          - Dendrocoelidae
      - Geoplanoidea
        - Dugesiidae
        - Geoplanidae

Phylogenetic subtree including five dugesiid genera after Álvarez-Presas et al., 2008:

- Dugesiidae
  - Girardia
  - - Neppia
    - - Cura
      - - Schmidtea
        - Dugesia
