= Kenkia =

Scientific classification
- Kingdom: Animalia
- Phylum: Platyhelminthes
- Order: Tricladida
- Family: Kenkiidae
- Genus: Kenkia; Hyman, 1937

Type species
- Kenkia rhynchida Hyman, 1937

Species
- K. glandulosa (Hyman, 1956); K. lewisi (Kenk, 1975); K. rhynchida Hyman, 1937

Synonyms
- Macrocotyla Hyman, 1956

Genus of freshwater planarians

Kenkia is a genus of cave-dwelling freshwater planarians native to the United States. Described in 1937 by American zoologist Libbie Hyman and named in honor of the Slovenian zoologist Roman Kenk, three species are currently recognized.

== Taxonomy and history ==
American zoologist Libbie Hyman described the genus Kenkia and its type species by monotypy Kenkia rhynchida in a 1937 issue of the Transactions of the American Microscopical Society based on four specimens collected from Malheur Cave in Oregon by Carl Leavitt Hubbs. Hyman named the genus after the Slovenian zoologist Roman Kenk in recognition of his contributions to planarian systematics. In the same article Hyman would erect the new family Kenkiidae, characterized by testes located before the pharynx and the absence of eyes and adenodactyls, to include Kenkia and the fellow cave-dwelling planarian genus Sphalloplana. This family placement was not widely accepted at the time, with other authors placing Kenkia and Sphalloplana in the family Planariidae.

In 1956 Hyman would erect the genus Macrocotyla and described the species M. glandulosa, an eyeless cave-dwelling planarian from Missouri, which she placed in the family Dendrocoelidae. In 1974, Ian Raymond Ball proposed that the family Kenkiidae be redesignated as the subfamily Kenkiinae within Dendrocoelidae in order to accommodate Kenkia, Sphalloplana, and Macrocotyla. Roman Kenk would redefine Kenkiidae as a family in 1975, alongside the description of Macrocotyla lewisi and recombination of Sphalloplana hoffmasteri as Macrocotyla hoffmasteri. Masaharu Kawakatsu and Robert W. Mitchell would reduce Macrocotyla to synonymy with Kenkia in 1981 after examining new specimens of K. rhynchida, the type species, and finding the same unique internal pharyngeal musculature as that of Macrocotyla. Kawakatsu and Mitchell's redefinition of Kenkia included four species: K. rhynchida, K. glandulosa, K. lewisi, and K. hoffmasteri. K. hoffmasteri would be removed back to the genus Sphalloplana by Roman Kenk in 1989 on the basis of differences its pharyngeal musculature, leaving three species in Kenkia.

== Species ==
The genus Kenkia includes the following species:

- Kenkia glandulosa (Hyman, 1956)
- Kenkia lewisi (Kenk, 1975)
- Kenkia rhynchida Hyman, 1937

Species formerly placed in this genus include:

- Kenkia hoffmasteri (Hyman, 1954) – now accepted as Sphalloplana hoffmasteri Hyman, 1954
