= Kawakatsua =

Scientific classification
- Kingdom: Animalia
- Phylum: Platyhelminthes
- Order: Tricladida
- Family: Dimarcusidae
- Genus: Kawakatsua; Sluys, 2019
- Species: K. pumila

Binomial name
- Kawakatsua pumila Sluys, 2019

Genus of flatworms

Kawakatsua is a genus of triclad belonging to the family Dimarcusidae. It is monotypic, containing the sole species Kawakatsua pumila. It is known from type specimens found on Barro Colorado Island.

== Etymology ==
The generic name was given in honor of Masaharu Kawakatsu, for his contributions to planarian systematics. The specific epithet is derived from the Latin pumilis, "dwarfish, little", in reference to the species' small size.

== Description ==
Kawakatsua pumila ranges from 2.4 to 2.55 mm in length. It's a white color, and lacks eyes. Its front end is rounded and broad, while its back end is wide and pointed.

Ronald Sluys described the dorsal and ventral epidermis as being "packed with rhabdites." Its adhesive glands secrete directly through the epidermis. It lacks adhesive papillae. The front intestinal trunk extends up to the brain. The pharynx is in the body's lower half. The opening of its mouth is in the pharyngeal pocket. The entire copulatory apparatus is in the body's lower half, at the far tail end. Its testes are distributed irregularly. The ovaries are around 100 to 200 μm behind the brain. The vasa deferentia form vesicles filled with sperm. At the root of the penis papilla, the sperm ducts form a loop and unite to form the ejaculatory duct. The penis papilla is shaped like a cone and lacks a penis bulb.
