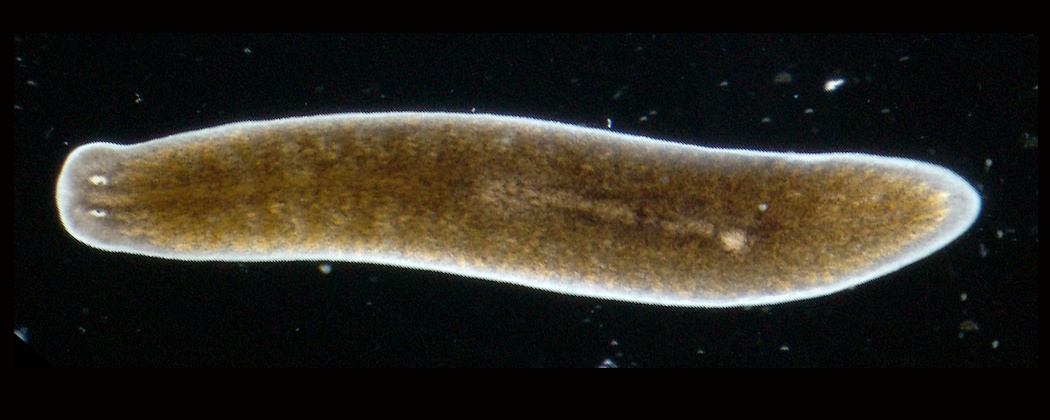

Scientific classification
- Kingdom: Animalia
- Phylum: Platyhelminthes
- Order: Tricladida
- Family: Planariidae
- Genus: Planaria
- Species: P. torva

Binomial name
- Planaria torva (O. F. Müller, 1773)

Synonyms
- Fasciola torva O. F. Müller, 1773; Dendroplanaria torva Komárek, 1926; Planaria torfrida Perkins, 1928; Dugesia torva (Müller O. F., 1773)

= Planaria torva =

Species of flatworms

Planaria torva is a species of planarian in the family Planariidae. When an individual is cut into pieces, each piece has the ability to regenerate into a fully formed individual.

== Diet ==
The food of P. torva consists of freshwater gastropods, tubificid worms, and freshwater arthropods, such as isopods of the genus Asellus and chironomid larvae, although it shows a clear preference for snails. In the United Kingdom, P. torva is a successful predator of the invasive New Zealand mud snail (Potamopyrgus jenkinsi).
