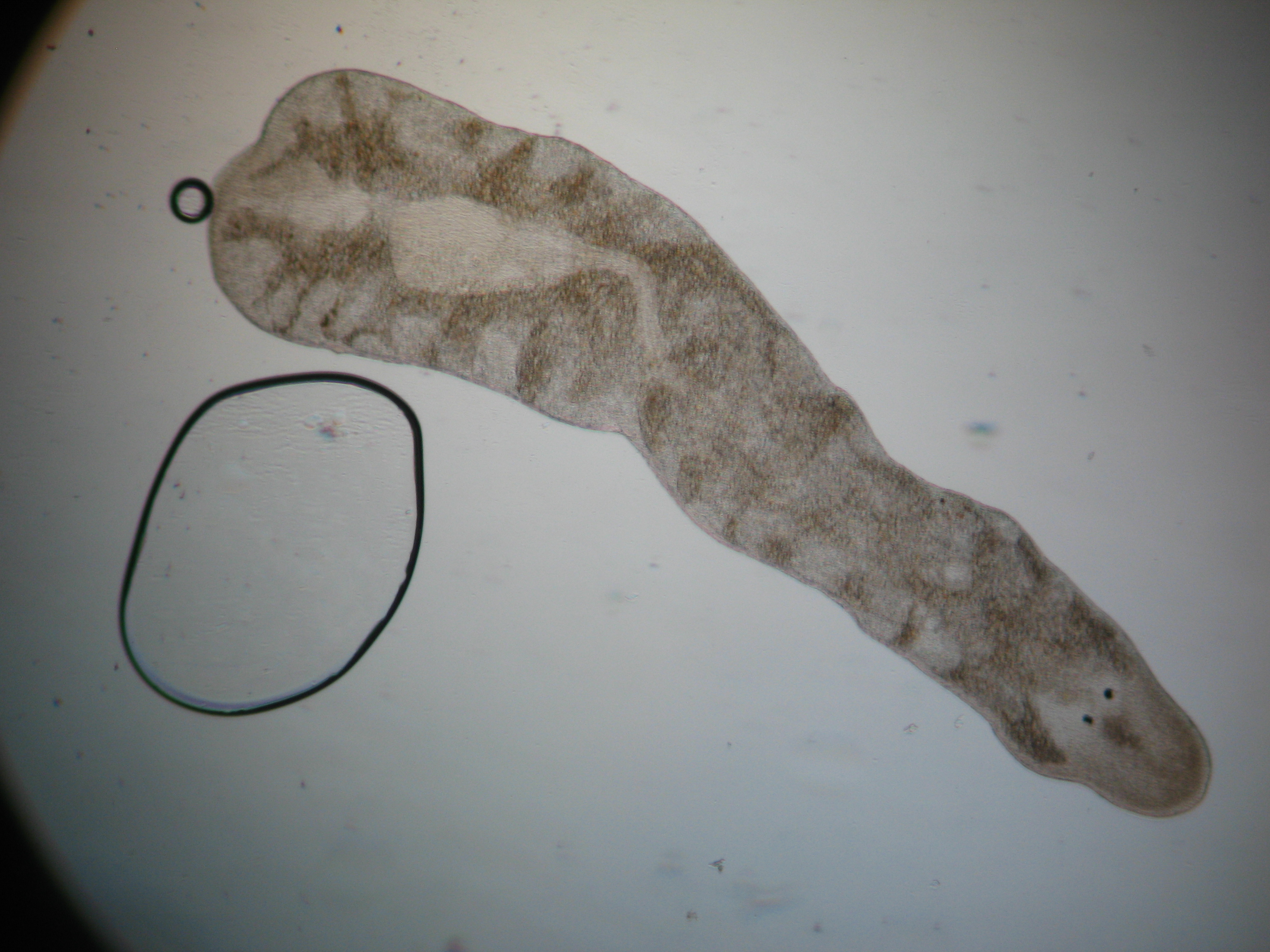
- Sabussowia ronaldi

Scientific classification
- Kingdom: Animalia
- Phylum: Platyhelminthes
- Order: Tricladida
- Suborder: Maricola; Hallez, 1892

Superfamilies
- Cercyroidea; Bdellouroidea; Procerodoidea

= Maricola =

Suborder of flatworms

Maricola is a suborder of triclad flatworms including species that mainly inhabit salt water environments. However, some species are also known from freshwater or brackish waters.

== Taxonomy and phylogeny ==
=== History ===
The Maricola group was first proposed by Hallez in 1892. He recognized three families: Otoplanida, Procerodida and Bdellourida. Two years later, in 1884, Hallez renamed these families as Otoplanidae, Procerodidae and Bdellouridae. In 1906 Böhmig classified the Maricola in two families and five subfamilies: Procerodidae (Euprocerodinae, Cercyrinae, Micropharynginae) and Bdellouridae (Uteriporinae, Eubdellourinae). In 1909 Wilhelmi wrote a monograph on the group in which five families were described: Procerodidae, Uteriporidae, Cercyridae, Bdellouridae, Micropharyngidae. Von Graff used the same classification in 1916. In 1989 Sluys recognized the six present families on the basis of phylogenetic analyses of the whole group. However, recent molecular studies do not recover the currently established families.

=== Classification ===
Current taxonomical classification:

- Order Tricladida
  - Suborder Maricola
    - Superfamily Cercyroidea
      - Family Centrovarioplanidae
      - Family Cercyridae
      - Family Meixnerididae
    - Superfamily Bdellouroidea
      - Family Uteriporidae
      - Family Bdellouridae
    - Superfamily Procerodoidea
      - Family Procerodidae
    - Superfamily incerta sedis
      - Genus Micropharynx
      - Genus Minutaplana
      - Genus Pusillaplana
      - Genus Tiddles

=== Phylogeny ===
Phylogenetic supertree after Sluys et al., 2009:

- Tricladida
  - Maricola
  - - Cavernicola
    - Continenticola
      - Planarioidea
        - Planariidae
        - - Kenkiidae
          - Dendrocoelidae
      - Geoplanoidea
        - Dugesiidae
        - Geoplanidae
