= Cura fortis =

Scientific classification
- Kingdom: Animalia
- Phylum: Platyhelminthes
- Order: Tricladida
- Family: Dugesiidae
- Genus: Cura
- Species: C. fortis

Binomial name
- Cura fortis Sluys & Kawakatsu, 2001

Species of flatworm

Cura fortis is a species of freshwater planarian belonging to the family Dugesiidae. It is found in New Zealand.

== Etymology ==
The specific epithet is derived from the Latin fortis, meaning "firm". This is in reference to the species' large penial papilla.

== Description ==
Cura fortis is about eight millimeters long and 3.5 mm wide. It can range from a dark brown to reddish color on its backside, and its underside is a dark grey with black spots. Its eyes are set in unpigmented patches.
