= Stephen Robert Litt =

American researcher (born 2004)

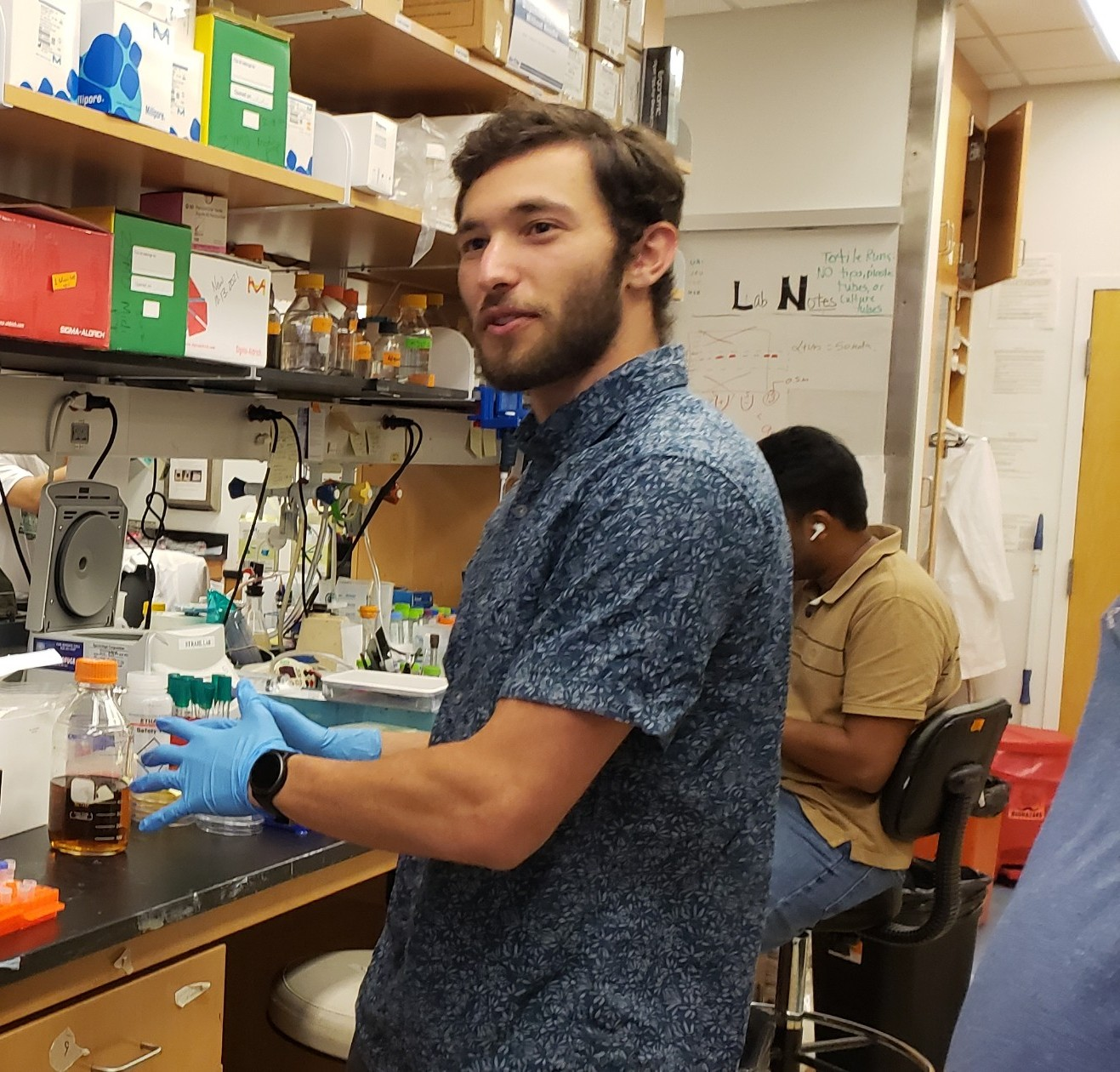
Stephen Robert Litt Stephen Robert Litt in 2025
- Born: August 2, 2004 (age 21); Atlanta, Georgia
- Citizenship: American
- Education: UNC- Chapel Hill: (BS) Chemistry/Biochemistry, (BA) Music
- Occupation: Student researcher

Stephen Robert Litt (born August 2, 2004) is an American student researcher known for science fair projects related to cancer research. He studied the effects of epigallocatechin gallate (EGCG), a chemical compound in green tea, on tumor growth in planarian worms and has demonstrated the positive effects of EGCG on human breast and cervical cancer cells. He is currently engaged in histone and epigenetic research at UNC-Chapel Hill.

== Overview ==
Litt started entering science fairs in first grade. In seventh grade, he worked on a project that gained attention at the state and national levels. After two of his family friends were diagnosed with breast cancer, he investigated whether EGCG, an antioxidant found in green tea, could affect tumor formation in planaria, a type of flatworm with stem cells (neoblasts) similar to human cancer cells.

His experiment involved dividing 100 planaria into four groups and exposing them to different environmental conditions, including EGCG and a carcinogen. Tumors formed when the planarians were exposed only to the carcinogen. The worms exposed to both EGCG and the carcinogen did not develop tumors, strongly suggesting EGCG may have a protective effect upon this model organism.

The project won multiple awards at the Georgia Science and Engineering Fair. It drew interest from researchers, including those at the Allen Discovery Center at Tufts University, where Litt was later invited to tour the labs.

Litt continued studying EGCG in high school. He later tested the compound on human breast and cervical cancer cells and reported that it killed cancer cells without harming normal epithelial cells. He also examined how EGCG might interact with proteins linked to cancer metastasis, specifically demonstrating that EGCG binds to the 67LR protein, which is responsible for cancer metastasis.

In 2022, Litt presented his work at the Cobb-Paulding Science Fair, where he won the Top Overall Project award. He was also a finalist at the Regeneron International Science and Engineering Fair (ISEF) multiple times during high school. Litt was also invited to the Women’s Malignancies group at the NIH in Bethesda as a guest speaker to present his research.

== Personal life ==
Litt plays the oboe, serving as the principal oboist of the UNC-Chapel Hill Orchestra, is a member of a chamber group, plays tennis, is a sports statistics enthusiast, and is an Eagle Scout.

== Recognitions ==
- Guest presenter at NIH - Women’s Malignancies Group by invitation
- Georgia Science and Engineering Fair award
- Guest at Tufts University’s Allen Discovery Center
