= Kenkia glandulosa =

Conservation status
- Imperiled (NatureServe)

Scientific classification
- Kingdom: Animalia
- Phylum: Platyhelminthes
- Order: Tricladida
- Family: Kenkiidae
- Genus: Kenkia
- Species: K. glandulosa

Binomial name
- Kenkia glandulosa (Hyman, 1956)

Synonyms
- Macrocotyla glandulosa Hyman, 1956; Macrocotyla glandularis Hyman, 1956

Species of flatworm

Kenkia glandulosa, commonly known as the pink planarian, is a flatworm in the family Kenkiidae. It is found only in the Devil's Icebox cave in Rock Bridge Memorial State Park, Boone County, Missouri, United States. The rarity of this species was once cited as a reason to oppose the construction of a shopping mall in the area.

The species is an eyeless and depigmented flatworm that inhabits the undersides of rocks. It is currently a species of conservation concern in the state of Missouri.
