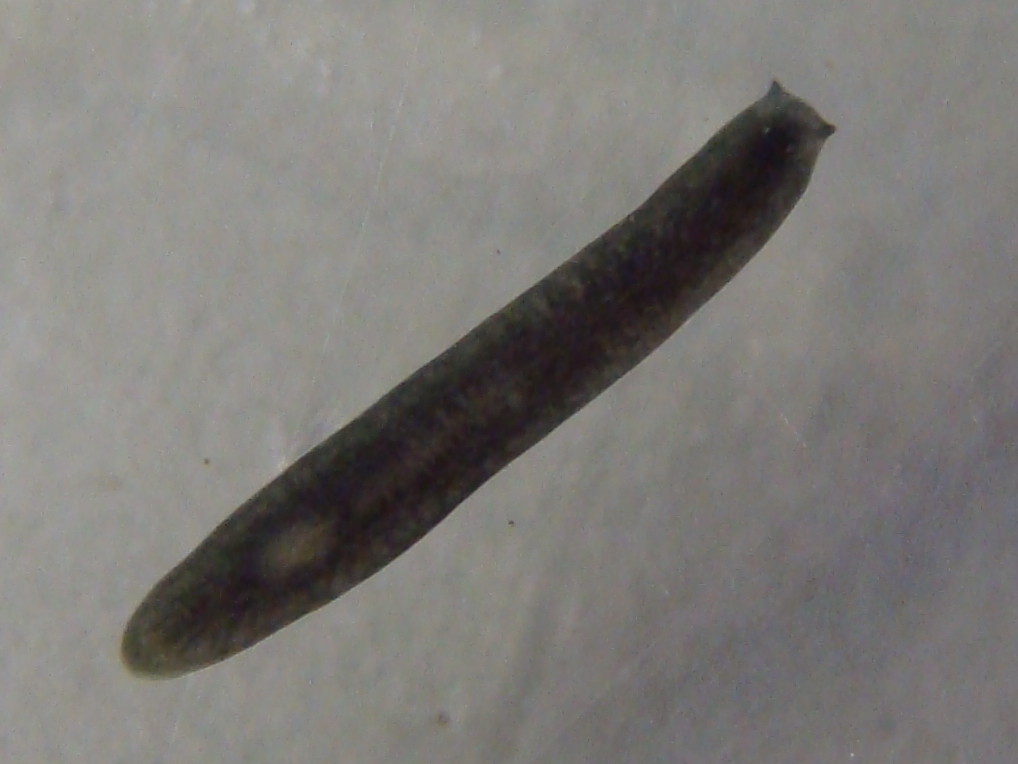
- Crenobia alpina

Scientific classification
- Kingdom: Animalia
- Phylum: Platyhelminthes
- Order: Tricladida
- Suborder: Continenticola
- Superfamily: Planarioidea; Stimpson, 1857

Families
- Dendrocoelidae; Kenkiidae; Planariidae

= Planarioidea =

Superfamily of flatworms

Planarioidea is a superfamily of freshwater triclads that comprises the families Dendrocoelidae, Kenkiidae and Planariidae.

== Phylogeny ==
Phylogenetic supertree after Sluys et al., 2009:

- Tricladida
  - Maricola
  - - Cavernicola
    - Continenticola
      - Planarioidea
        - Planariidae
        - - Kenkiidae
          - Dendrocoelidae
      - Geoplanoidea
        - Dugesiidae
        - Geoplanidae
