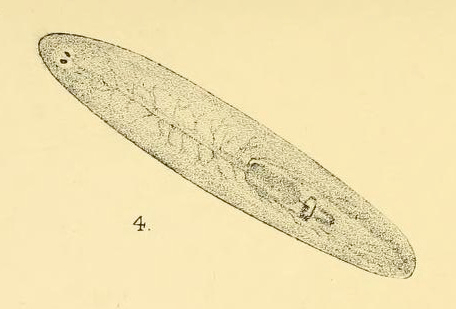

Scientific classification
- Domain: Eukaryota
- Kingdom: Animalia
- Phylum: Platyhelminthes
- Order: Tricladida
- Family: Planariidae
- Genus: Planaria
- Species: P. kempi

Binomial name
- Planaria kempi Whitehouse, 1913

= Planaria kempi =

Species of flatworm

Planaria kempi is a species of planarian belonging to the family Planariidae. It has been found in India. It is named after Stanley Wells Kemp.

== Description ==
The type specimen of Planaria kempi was described as being 9.5 millimeters long and two millimeters wide. It has no visible "neck". It has two small eyes, each surrounded by an unpigmented area. The backside of the species is a medium-brown color, with a pale underside. The underside has two pores, one for the mouth and one for the genitalia.
