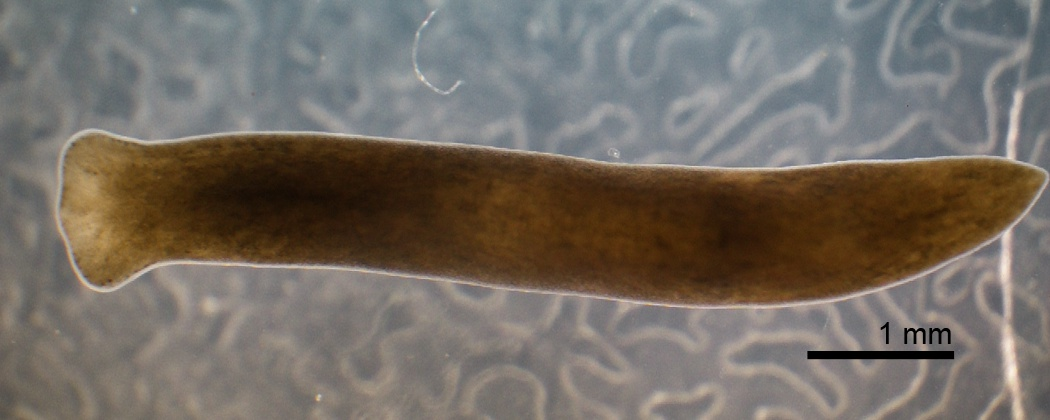
- Polycelis nigra

Scientific classification
- Kingdom: Animalia
- Phylum: Platyhelminthes
- Order: Tricladida
- Family: Planariidae
- Genus: Polycelis; Ehrenberg, 1831

Synonyms
- Polycelidia Livanov & Zabusova, 1940; Polycoelis Beneden, 1861; Polyscelis Girard, 1850; Sorocelides Zabusova, 1929

= Polycelis =

Genus of flatworms

Polycelis is a genus of planarians in the family Planariidae found in the Holarctic region (North America and Eurasia). The genus was described in 1831 by Christian Gottfried Ehrenberg and currently has no consensus on the exact number of species.

== Description ==
Species of Polycelis are characterized by having multiple eyes on the anterior region, similar to the related genera Seidlia and Ijimia. It is differentiated from them by lacking both a highly developed muscle coat around the male atrium (as seen in Seidlia) and adenodactyls (as seen in Ijimia).

== Habitat ==
Most species of Polycelis inhabit clean, high-altitudinal streams with water temperatures between 0 and 14 °C in Eurasia and North America.

== Species ==
The following species are recognised in the genus Polycelis:

- Polycelis aurantiacus Panceri, 1875
- Polycelis benazzii de Beauchamp, 1955
- Polycelis bilinearis Diesing, 1850
- Polycelis brunnea (Müller, 1773)
- Polycelis catulus Girard, 1893
- Polycelis cormita Hunt, 1948
- Polycelis coronata (Girard, 1891)
- Polycelis eburnea (Muth, 1912)
- Polycelis elegans Diesing, 1850
- Polycelis eudendrocoeloides Zabusova, 1929
- Polycelis eurantron Zabusova, 1936
- Polycelis fallax Quatrefage, 1845
- Polycelis felina (Dalyell, 1814)
- Polycelis gracilis (Seidl, 1911)
- Polycelis jinglensis Liu, 1996
- Polycelis jingyuanica Liu, 1996
- Polycelis kashmirica Liu, 1993
- Polycelis koslowi (Zabusov, 1911)
- Polycelis kulsaika Zabusov-Zhdanova, 1947
- Polycelis lhunzhubica Liu, 1993
- Polycelis linkoi Sabussov, 1901
- Polycelis nigra (Müller, 1774)
- Polycelis nigro-fusca Diesing, 1850
- Polycelis nyingchica Liu, 1993
- Polycelis oculimarginata (Palombi, 1931)
- Polycelis pallida Diesing, 1850
- Polycelis pamirensis de Beauchamp, 1961
- Polycelis panniculatus Girard, 1893
- Polycelis pantherina Babalean, 2022
- Polycelis pathan de Beauchamp, 1959
- Polycelis polyopis Zabusova, 1936
- Polycelis pulla Diesing, 1850
- Polycelis receptaculosa (Livanov & Zabusova, 1940)
- Polycelis relicta (Sabussowa, 1929)
- Polycelis sapporo (Ijima & Kaburaki, 1916)
- Polycelis schmidti (Zabusov, 1916)
- Polycelis sierrensis Kenk, 1973
- Polycelis sinensis Liu, 1993
- Polycelis stummeri (Seidl, 1911)
- Polycelis surantion Zabusova, 1936
- Polycelis tenuis Ijima, 1884
- Polycelis tibetica Hyman, 1934
- Polycelis tothi Mehely, 1927
- Polycelis vaginuloides Diesing, 1850
- Polycelis variabilis Girard, 1850
- Polycelis wutaishanica Liu, 1993
- Polycelis yangchengensis Dong, Chen, Zhang & Liu, 2017
- Polycelis xigazensis Liu, 1993
