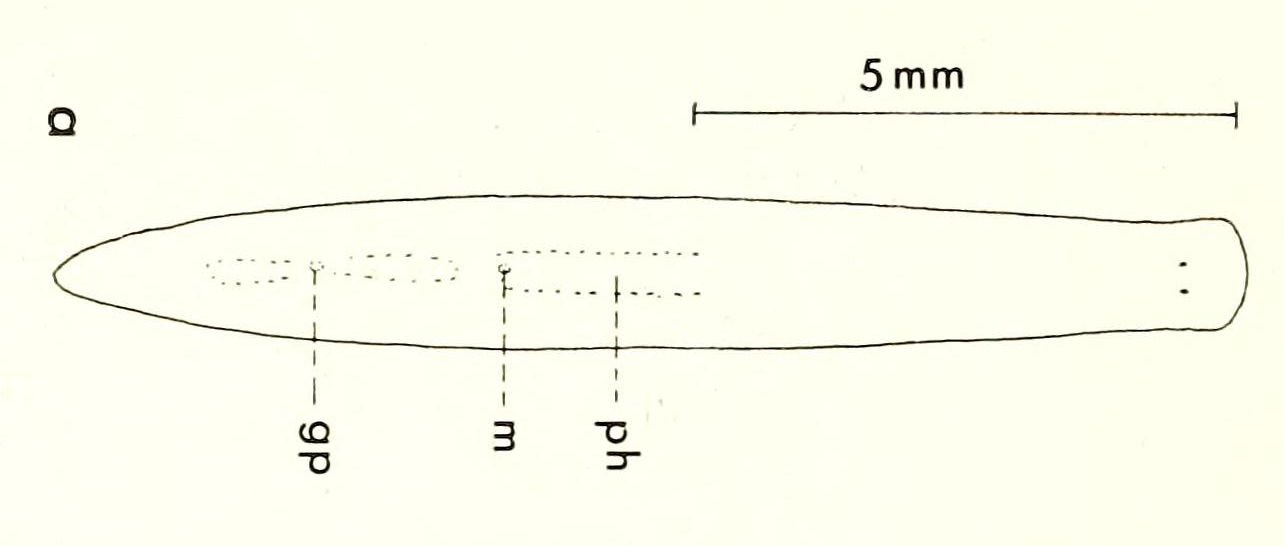
- Paraplanaria dactyligera musculosa

Scientific classification
- Kingdom: Animalia
- Phylum: Platyhelminthes
- Order: Tricladida
- Family: Planariidae
- Genus: Paraplanaria
- Species: P. dactyligera

Binomial name
- Paraplanaria dactyligera (Kenk, 1935)

Subspecies
- P. d. dactyligera (Kenk, 1969); P. d. musculosa (Kenk, 1969)

Synonyms
- Planaria dactyligera Kenk, 1935

= Paraplanaria dactyligera =

Species of flatworm

Paraplanaria dactyligera is a species of triclad belonging to the family Planariidae. It has been found in the eastern United States.

== Description ==
Paraplanaria dactyligera is around 13 millimeters long and 1.75 mm wide. Its color can range from near-black to a brown or gray, with a usually-lighter ventral side. Its color can show a faint clouded effect. A small area above each of its eyes is unpigmented. It's truncated; the edges of its head are rounded. It has two small eyes.
