= Devil's Icebox =

The Devil's Icebox could refer to underground drafts found at:

- Pilot Knob (Iron County, Missouri), a “knob” or hill with an abandoned mine shaft
- The Devil's Icebox, a cave in Rock Bridge Memorial State Park near Columbia, Missouri
