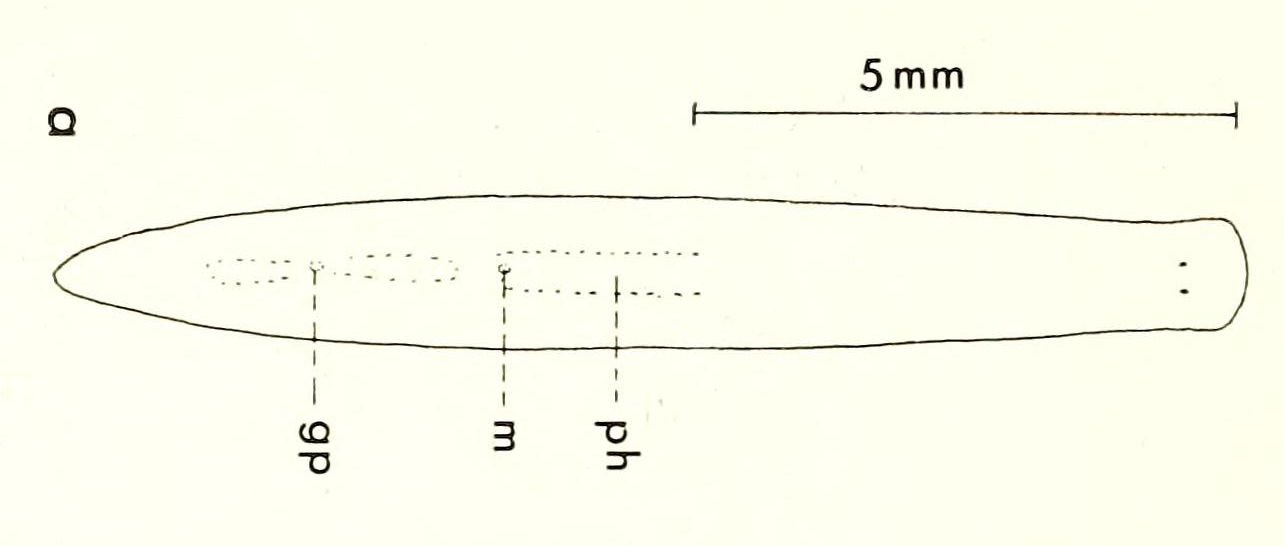
- Paraplanaria dactyligera musculosa

Scientific classification
- Kingdom: Animalia
- Phylum: Platyhelminthes
- Order: Tricladida
- Family: Planariidae
- Genus: Paraplanaria; Ball & Gourbault, 1978

Species
- See text

= Paraplanaria =

Genus of flatworms

Paraplanaria is a genus of triclad belonging to the family Planariidae.

== Description ==
The genus is characterized by a "musculo-glandular posterior diverticulum of the atrium".

== Species ==
Paraplanaria currently contains the following two species:

- Paraplanaria dactyligera (Kenk, 1935)
- Paraplanaria occulta (Kenk, 1969)
