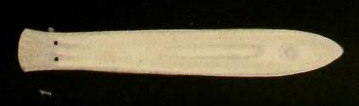

Scientific classification
- Domain: Eukaryota
- Kingdom: Animalia
- Phylum: Platyhelminthes
- Order: Tricladida
- Family: Procerodidae
- Genus: Procerodes
- Species: P. lobatus

Binomial name
- Procerodes lobatus Schmidt, 1862

= Procerodes lobatus =

Species of flatworm

Procerodes lobatus is a species of triclad in the family Procerodidae.

== Description ==
Procerodes lobatus has two small, black eyes, a squared, flat head and a long, flat body. It has lobes on the side of its head. Its body is a milky-white to yellowish color.
