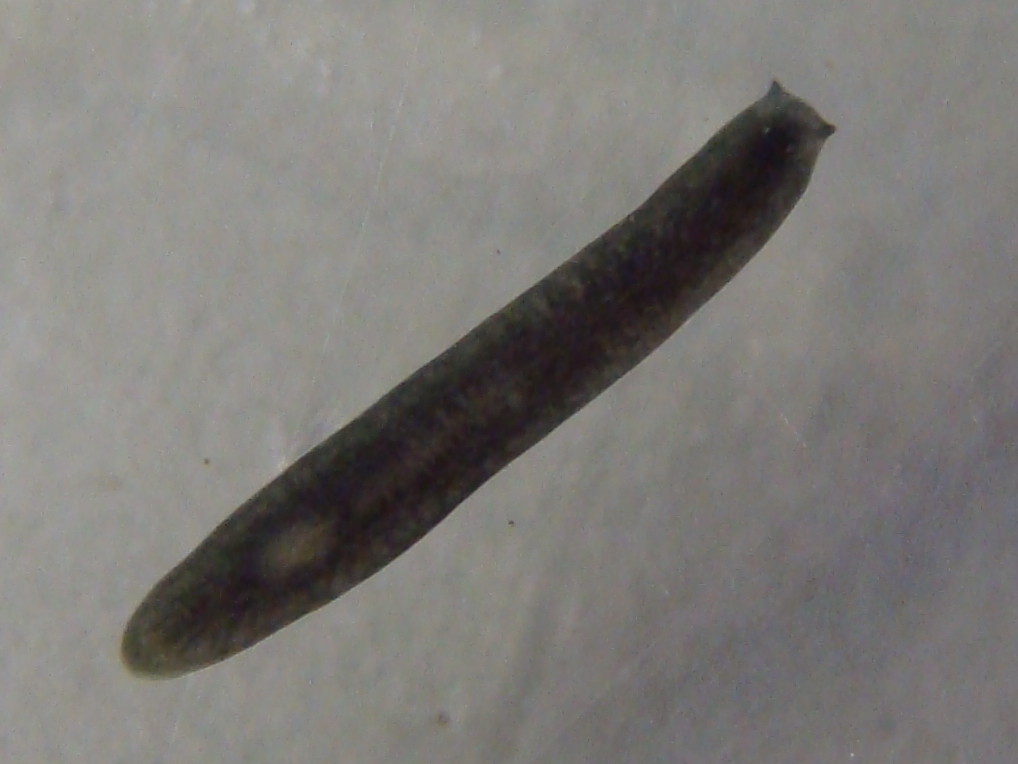

Scientific classification
- Domain: Eukaryota
- Kingdom: Animalia
- Phylum: Platyhelminthes
- Order: Tricladida
- Family: Planariidae
- Genus: Crenobia
- Species: C. alpina

Binomial name
- Crenobia alpina (Dana, 1766)

Subspecies
- See text

Synonyms
- Dugesia alpina (Dana, 1766); Fasciola alpina (Dana, 1766); Hirudo alpina Dana, 1766; Planaria alpina (Dana, 1766)

= Crenobia alpina =

Species of flatworm

Crenobia alpina, known as the alpine flatworm, is a species of triclad belonging to the family Planariidae. They are found across the Alps.

== Taxonomy ==
Crenobia alpina has been considered by some to be a species complex, with some subspecies of Crenobia alpina being placed as separate species within the genus Crenobia, and others having uncertain taxonomic placement. All subspecies are found within mountainous regions of Europe, particularly the Alps, but have been found within mountainous areas of Eastern Europe as well.

Recognized subspecies include:

- C. a. alba (Oye, 1935) - Central Europe, the Alps and Great Britain
- C. a. alpina(Dana, 1766) - Central Europe, the Alps, Great Britain, Romania
- C. a. anophthalma (Mrazek, 1907) (sometimes considered to be a separate species, Crenobia anophthalma) - Dinaric Alps, Montenegro
- C. a. bathycola (Steinmann, 1911) (sometimes considered to be a separate species, Crenobia bathycola) - Swiss Alps
- C. a. corsica (Arndt, 1920) (sometimes considered to be a separate species, Crenobia corsica) - Corsica
- C. a. meridionalis (Thienemann, 1938) - Northern Europe
- C. a. montenigrina (Mrazek, 1904) (both this subspecies and the species Crenobia montenegrina, under the same describing authority, are accepted by taxonomic databases) - Lake Ohrid, Romania
- C. a. septentrionalis|(Thienemann, 1938) - Southern Europe, Rügen
- C. a. teratophila (Steinmann, 1908) (both this subspecies and the species Crenobia teratophila, under the same describing authority, are accepted by taxonomic databases)
