= Paul Hallez =

French zoologist and embryologist (1846–1938)

Paul Hallez (10 September 1846 - 2 November 1938) was a French zoologist and embryologist born in Lille.

In 1864 he began his scientific career as a préparateur of natural history under Jules Gosselet (1832–1916) at the Faculté des Sciences in Lille. He later defended his thesis at the Sorbonne with an award winning treatise on Turbellaria titled Contributions à l'histoire naturelle des turbellariés. He held the chair of zoology at Lille from 1888 to 1906, then served as chair of comparative anatomy and embryology from 1907 until his retirement in 1919.

In 1888 he founded a marine biological laboratory at Le Portel that was associated with the Université Lille Nord de France.

His scientific work largely dealt with flatworms, nematodes, the phyla- Bryozoa and Nemertea, etc. He described a number of new species collected from Jean-Baptiste Charcot's Antarctic expeditions.

The following species are named after Hallez:

- Timea hallezi (Topsent, 1891)
- Procerastea halleziana (Malaquin, 1893)
- Scaptognathus hallezi (Trouessart, 1894)
- Obrimoposthia hallezi (Böhmig, 1908).

The genus Hallezia Sand, 1896 (Protozoa) is also named after him.

== Selected writings ==
- Contributions à l'histoire naturelle des turbellariés, 1879 Full text
- Embryogénie des Dendrocles d'eau douce, 1887 Full text
- Morphogénie générale et affinités des Turbellariés (Introduction à une Embryologie comparée de ces animaux), 1892
- Catalogue des rhabdoclides, triclades & polyclades du nord de la France, 1894. Full text
