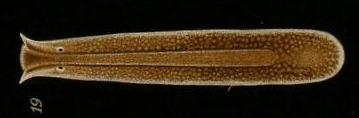

Scientific classification
- Kingdom: Animalia
- Phylum: Platyhelminthes
- Order: Tricladida
- Family: Procerodidae
- Genus: Procerodes
- Species: P. littoralis

Binomial name
- Procerodes littoralis (Strøm, 1768)

Synonyms
- List: Fovia littoralis (Stimpson, 1857); Gunda graffi Bohmig, 1893; Gunda ulvae Ørsted, 1843; Planaria cornuta Müller, 1776; Planaria frequens Leidy, 1855; Planaria littoralis Müller, 1776; Planaria ulvae Ørsted, 1888; Procerodes frequens (Leidy, 1855); Procerodes graffi (Bohmig, 1893); Procerodes litoralis (Strøm, 1768); Procerodes ulvae (Ørsted, 1843); Procerodes wheatlandi Girard, 1850

= Procerodes littoralis =

Species of flatworm

Procerodes littoralis is a species of triclad flatworm widely distributed on the shores of northwestern Europe and on the east coast of North America from Newfoundland northwards.

== Description ==
Procerodes littoralis is a small flatworm with a maximum length of 9 mm (0.35 in) and width of 1.5 mm (0.06 in), but it is usually smaller than this. It has a fairly wide head with two distinctive marginal tentacles with a pair of eyes behind them. The neck region is slightly narrower and the body is plump and bottle-shaped. The dorsal surface is greyish or olive-brown and the internal organs are sometimes visible through the cuticle. The eyes are surrounded by pale patches which are separated by a slightly darker stripe.

== Distribution and habitat ==
Procerodes littoralis is found in the temperate northwestern Atlantic Ocean, on the European coastline, and on the coast of North America from Newfoundland northwards. It is common round the coasts of Britain on the upper and middle shores where it is the most common marine flatworm. It is tolerant of wide fluctuations in salinity, and is often being plentiful in areas where freshwater streams flow across the beach; it conceals itself under boulders and stones, on shingle and sand.

== Ecology ==
The chosen habitat of this species is streambeds on the upper shore. Here it is exposed for about eight hours in every tidal cycle to fresh water and for about four hours to salt water. It can survive in both these environments but is inactive at the two extremes of 0 psu and 44 psu. At high tide it tends to gather under large stones where it is protected from wave action while at low tide it tends to burrow down to the base of the gravel where there is probably some residual salinity. This is where it feeds on detritus and such small invertebrates as oligochaetes and marine isopods, including Jaera albifrons and Jaera nordmanni.

Procerodes littoralis starts to breed when about 5 mm (0.2 in) long. It is a hermaphrodite and fertilisation is internal. Batches of about five eggs are laid in oval capsules about 1 mm (0.04 in) in diameter which are glued to the underside of stones. The eggs undergo direct development, hatching directly into miniature adults 2 to 4 mm (0.08 to 0.16 in) long.
