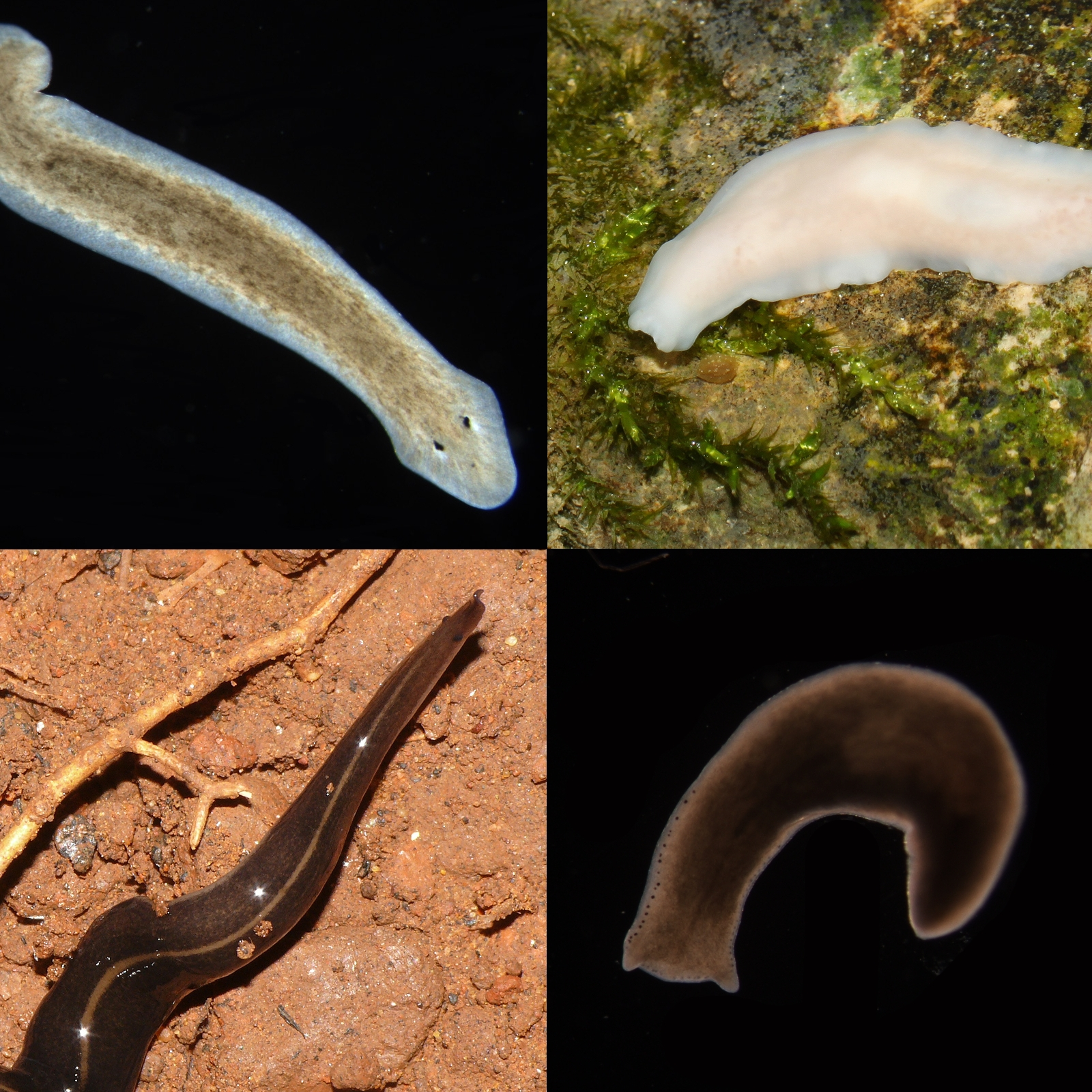
- From upper left: Dugesia subtentaculata, a dugesiid; Dendrocoelum cavaticum, a Dendrocoelidae; Platydemus manokwari, a Geoplanidae; and Polycelis felina, a Planariidae.

Scientific classification
- Domain: Eukaryota
- Kingdom: Animalia
- Phylum: Platyhelminthes
- Order: Tricladida
- Suborder: Continenticola; Carranza et al., 1998

Superfamilies and families
- Planarioidea; Planariidae; Dendrocoelidae; Kenkiidae; Geoplanoidea; Dugesiidae; Geoplanidae

= Continenticola =

Clade of flatworms

Continenticola is a clade that includes the land planarians (Geoplanidae) and the freshwater triclads (Dendrocoelidae, Dugesiidae, Kenkiidae and Planariidae).

== Phylogeny ==
On the basis of molecular evidences, Carranza and colleagues suggested in 1998 that the families of freshwater and land flatworms must be grouped together in a monophyletic group that they coined Continenticola. This grouping was accepted by Ronald Sluys in 2009. Despite the molecular evidences, there are no morphological apomorphies supporting this clade.

Phylogenetic supertree after Sluys et al., 2009:

- Tricladida
  - Maricola
  - - Cavernicola
    - Continenticola
      - Planarioidea
        - Planariidae
        - - Kenkiidae
          - Dendrocoelidae
      - Geoplanoidea
        - Dugesiidae
        - Geoplanidae
