= Seidlia =

Seidlia may refer to:

- Seidlia (flatworm), a planarian genus in the family Planariidae
- Seidlia Opiz, a former plant genus in the family Cyperaceae, a junior synonym of Scirpus
- Seidlia Kostel., a former plant genus in the family Dipterocarpaceae, a junior synonym of Vatica
