= Micropharynx =

Scientific classification
- Kingdom: Animalia
- Phylum: Platyhelminthes
- Order: Tricladida
- Suborder: Maricola
- Genus: Micropharynx; Jägerskiöld, 1896

Species
- Micropharynx murmanica Awerinzeir, 1925; Micropharynx parasitica Jägerskiöld, 1896

Genus of flatworms

Micropharynx is a genus of planarian placed incertae sedis in the suborder Maricola.
