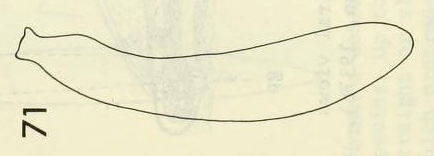
- Sphalloplana (Sphalloplana) mohri

Scientific classification
- Kingdom: Animalia
- Phylum: Platyhelminthes
- Order: Tricladida
- Superfamily: Planarioidea
- Family: Kenkiidae; Hyman, 1937

Type genus
- Kenkia Hyman, 1937

Genera
- Kenkia Hyman, 1937; Sphalloplana de Beauchamp, 1931; Vermipharyngiella Porfiriev & Timoshkin, 2013

= Kenkiidae =

Family of flatworms

Kenkiidae is a family of freshwater triclads. Their species can be found sporadically in caves, groundwater, and deep lakes in Central Asia, Far East and North America.

== Description ==
Species in the family Kenkiidae are characterized by a thickened marginal epidermis, i.e., the epidermis of the body margins have larger cells provided with bigger rhabdites than the epidermis of the rest of the body. Kenkiidae species have the testicles situated anterior to the pharynx, feature also common in the Dugesiidae and Planariidae. They have an anterior adhesive organ, which is also found in the family Dendrocoelidae. The inner muscles of the pharynx are divided in two layers. Kenkiidae species are not pigmented and they are usually blind.

== Taxonomy ==
American zoologist Libbie Hyman erected the family Kenkiidae in a 1937 issue of the Transactions of the American Microscopical Society, with Kenkia, named in honour of the Slovenian zoologist Roman Kenk, as the type genus. It was not widely accepted as a valid taxon by other authors, and in 1974 Ian Raymond Ball proposed that the family Kenkiidae be redesignated as the subfamily Kenkiinae within Dendrocoelidae. Roman Kenk would reinstate Kenkiidae as a family in 1975.

=== Phylogeny ===
In a 2006 morphological phylogenetic analysis, Ronald Sluys and Masaharu Kawakatsu found Kenkiidae to be a monophyletic sister group to the family Dendrocoelidae. Both families have an apomorphic anterior adhesive organ.

Phylogenetic supertree after Sluys et al., 2009:

- Tricladida
  - Maricola
  - - Cavernicola
    - Continenticola
      - Planarioidea
        - Planariidae
        - - Kenkiidae
          - Dendrocoelidae
      - Geoplanoidea
        - Dugesiidae
        - Geoplanidae

== Genera ==
The family Kenkiidae includes the following genera:

- Kenkia Hyman, 1937
- Sphalloplana de Beauchamp, 1931
- Vermipharyngiella Porfiriev & Timoshkin, 2013
