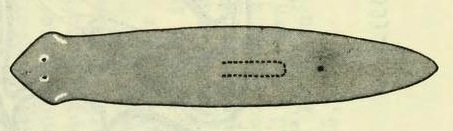

Scientific classification
- Domain: Eukaryota
- Kingdom: Animalia
- Phylum: Platyhelminthes
- Order: Tricladida
- Family: Dugesiidae
- Genus: Cura
- Species: C. foremanii

Binomial name
- Cura foremanii (Girard, 1852)

Synonyms
- Curtisia foremani (Girard, 1852); Curtisia simplicissima Graff, 1916; Curtisia simplissima Curtis, 1900; Dugesia foremanii Girard, 1852; Planaria foremanii Stringer, 1918; Planaria lugubris Schmidt, 1861; Planaria simplicissima Stevens, 1907; Planaria simplissima Curtis, 1900

= Cura foremanii =

Species of flatworm

Cura foremanii is a species of freshwater planarian belonging to the family Dugesiidae. It is found in freshwater habitats within North America.

== Etymology ==
The specific epithet was given in honor of Edward R. Foreman.

== Description ==
Cura foremanii is about 7–15 millimeters in length, and has a flat, oblong, broad, thick, oval-like shape. Its head is in the shape of a broad triangle with a blunt point. It has unpigmented circular dash-like regions on the side of its auricles; but its general body color ranges from dark brown or gray to black. Its underside is pale, but retains the same hue as its backside. It has two eyes; the eyes are a light grey or white with black pigment forming a "pupil".
