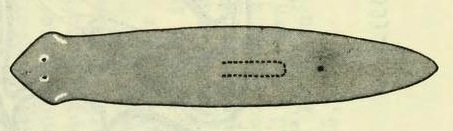
- Cura foremanii

Scientific classification
- Kingdom: Animalia
- Phylum: Platyhelminthes
- Order: Tricladida
- Family: Dugesiidae
- Genus: Cura; Strand, 1942

Species
- Cura foremanii; Cura fortis; Cura pinguis

= Cura (flatworm) =

Genus of flatworms

Cura is a genus of freshwater flatworm (triclads) belonging to the family Dugesiidae.

Cura was ranked as a subgenus of Dugesia until 1974, then it was elevated to the genus rank.

== Description ==
Individuals of this genus have a low triangle-shaped head.

== Distribution ==
Cura species present a disjunct distribution. C. foremanii inhabits North America, while C. fortis is found in New Zealand, and C. pinguis in Australia, New Zealand, and New Caledonia.

== Phylogeny ==
Phylogenetic tree including five dugesiid genera after Álvarez-Presas et al., 2008:

- Dugesiidae
  - Girardia
  - - Neppia
    - - Cura
      - - Schmidtea
        - Dugesia
