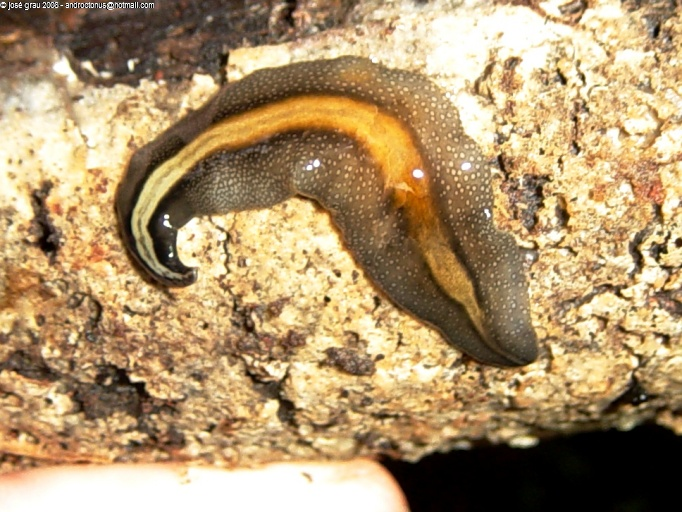
- Obama burmeisteri

Scientific classification
- Kingdom: Animalia
- Phylum: Platyhelminthes
- Order: Tricladida
- Suborder: Continenticola
- Superfamily: Geoplanoidea; Stimpson, 1857

Families
- Dugesiidae; Geoplanidae

= Geoplanoidea =

Superfamily of flatworms

Geoplanoidea is a superfamily of freshwater and land triclads that comprises the species of the Geoplanidae and the Dugesiidae families.

Dugesiidae and Geoplanidae share a duplication of the cluster that codifies for the 18S ribosomal RNA.

== Phylogeny ==
Phylogenetic supertree after Sluys et al., 2009:

- Tricladida
  - Maricola
  - - Cavernicola
    - Continenticola
      - Planarioidea
        - Planariidae
        - - Kenkiidae
          - Dendrocoelidae
      - Geoplanoidea
        - Dugesiidae
        - Geoplanidae
