= Cura pinguis =

Scientific classification
- Kingdom: Animalia
- Phylum: Platyhelminthes
- Order: Tricladida
- Family: Dugesiidae
- Genus: Cura
- Species: C. pinguis

Binomial name
- Cura pinguis Weiss, 1909

Synonyms
- Dugesia pinguis (Weiss, 1910); Planaria pinguis Weiss, 1910

Species of flatworm

Cura pinguis is a species of dugesiid triclad found in Australia and New Zealand.
