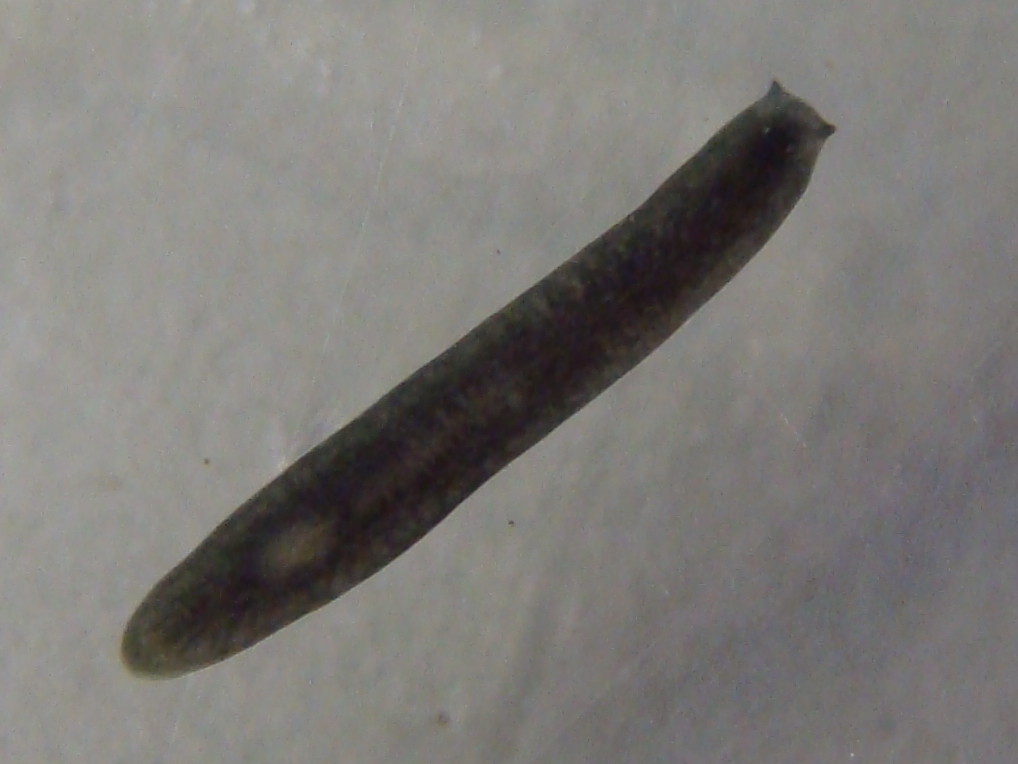
- Crenobia alpina

Scientific classification
- Kingdom: Animalia
- Phylum: Platyhelminthes
- Order: Tricladida
- Family: Planariidae
- Genus: Crenobia; Kenk, 1930

= Crenobia =

Genus of flatworms

Crenobia is a genus of planarians in the family Planariidae. It is endemic to Europe and Anatolia.

== Description ==
The genus Crenobia includes planarians with an extremely thick muscle coat surrounding the genital atrium. The copulatory bursa it relatively small when compared to other genera of freshwater planarians.

== Distribution ==
The genus Crenobia occurs in Anatolia and across most of Europe, including several islands in the Mediterranean Sea, although it seems to be absent in most of the Iberian Peninsula.

== Species ==
The following species are currently recognized in the genus Crenobia:

- Crenobia alpina (Dana, 1776)
- Crenobia anophthalma (Mrázek, 1907)
- Crenobia bathycola (Steinmann, 1911)
- Crenobia corsica (Arndt, 1922)
- Crenobia montenigrina (Mrázek, 1904)
