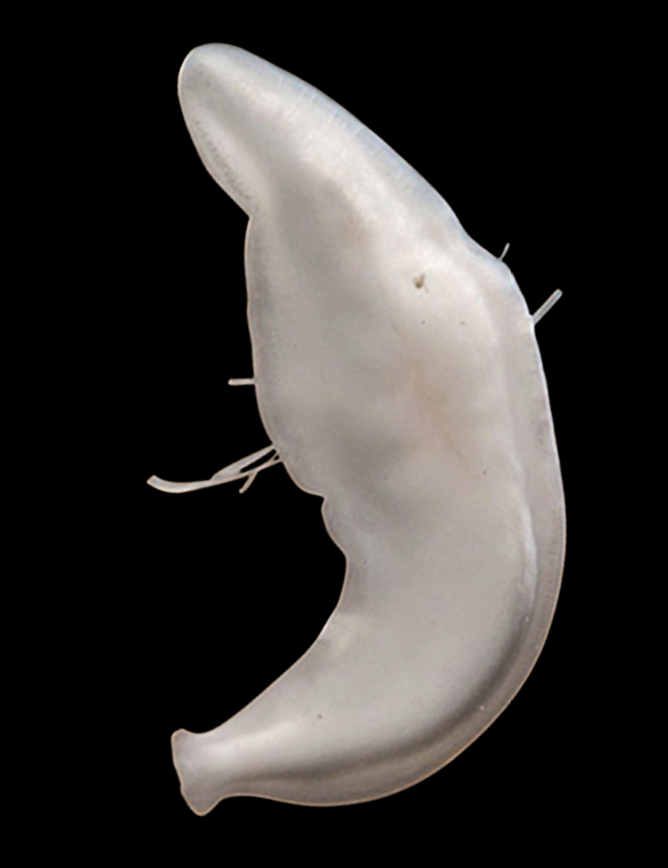
- Sphalloplana (Sphalloplana) mohri

Scientific classification
- Domain: Eukaryota
- Kingdom: Animalia
- Phylum: Platyhelminthes
- Order: Tricladida
- Family: Kenkiidae
- Genus: Sphalloplana de Beauchamp, 1931

Species
- See text

= Sphalloplana =

Genus of flatworms

Sphalloplana is a genus of triclads belonging to the family Kenkiidae.

== Species ==
Sphalloplana comprises two subgenera:

- Subgenus Speophila Hyman, 1937
  - Sphalloplana (Speophila) buchanani Hyman, 1937
  - Sphalloplana (Speophila) chandleri Kenk, 1977
  - Sphalloplana hoffmasteri Hyman, 1954
  - Sphalloplana (Speophila) hubrichti Hyman, 1945
  - Sphalloplana hypogea Kenk, 1984
  - Sphalloplana (Speophila) pricei Hyman, 1937
  - Sphalloplana (Speophila) virginiana Hyman, 1945
- Subgenus Sphalloplana de Beauchamp, 1931
  - Sphalloplana alabamensis Hyman, 1945
  - Sphalloplana (Sphalloplana) buchanani Hyman, 1937
  - Sphalloplana californica Kenk, 1977
  - Sphalloplana (Sphalloplana) chandleri Kenk, 1977
  - Sphalloplana consimilis Kenk, 1977
  - Sphalloplana coreana Kawakatsu & Kim, 1967
  - Sphalloplana culveri Kenk, 1977
  - Sphalloplana ductosacculata Livanov & Zabusova, 1940
  - Sphalloplana evaginata Kenk, 1977
  - Sphalloplana georgiana Hyman, 1954
  - Sphalloplana holsingeri Kenk, 1977
  - Sphalloplana (Sphalloplana) hubrichti (Hyman, 1945)
  - Sphalloplana kansensis Hyman, 1945
  - Sphalloplana kutscheri Mitchell, 1968
  - Sphalloplana mohri Hyman, 1938
  - Sphalloplana percoeca (Packard, 1879)
  - Sphalloplana (Sphalloplana) pricei Hyman, 1937
  - Sphalloplana reddelli Mitchell, 1968
  - Sphalloplana sloani Mitchell, 1968
  - Sphalloplana subtilis Kenk, 1977
  - Sphalloplana virginiana Hyman, 1945
  - Sphalloplana weingartneri Kenk, 1970
  - Sphalloplana zeschi Mitchell, 1968
