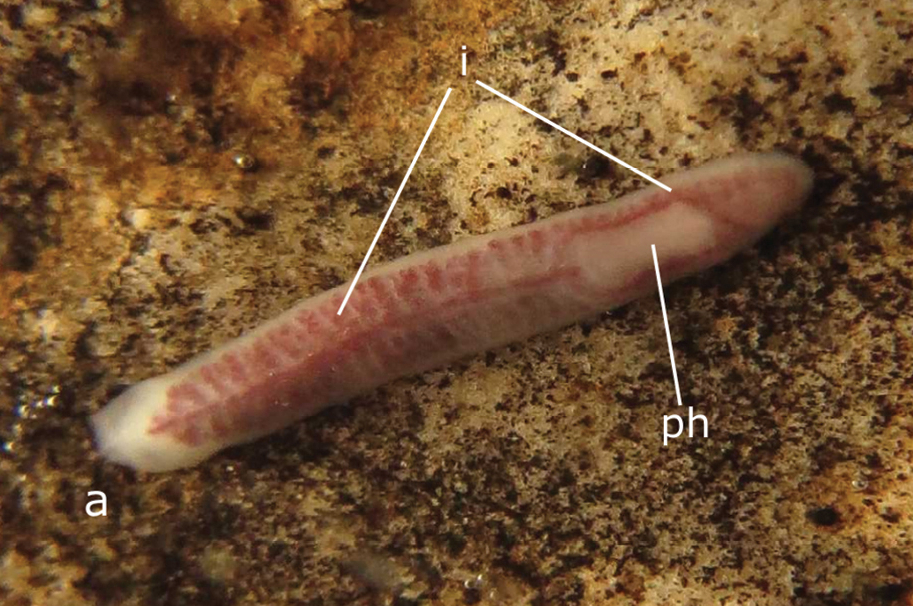
- Hausera hauseri

Scientific classification
- Kingdom: Animalia
- Phylum: Platyhelminthes
- Order: Tricladida
- Suborder: Cavernicola; Sluys, 1990

Families
- Amphibioplanidae; Dimarcusidae

= Cavernicola (suborder) =

Suborder of flatworms

Cavernicola is a suborder of planarians found mostly in freshwater habitats of caves, although some species occur on the surface.

== Description ==
The main morphological feature that defines the suborder Cavernicola is the placement of their ovaries. They are located more posteriorly than in other planarians, which usually have them close to the brain. The copulatory apparatus has a copulatory bursa in most species, although in some it is absent and is replaced by a connection to the intestine.

== Taxonomy ==
The suborder Cavernicola was originally erected for the family Dimarcusidae due to its unusual morphological features that did not match those of the other planarian suborders. Recently, the discovery of another unusual cave species led to the erection of a new family, Amphibioplanidae, which as also included in Cavernicola due to shared morphological features.
