= Meixnerididae =

Scientific classification
- Kingdom: Animalia
- Phylum: Platyhelminthes
- Order: Tricladida
- Superfamily: Cercyroidea
- Family: Meixnerididae; Westblad, 1952

Genera
- Meixnerides; Jugatovaria

Family of flatworms

Meixnerididae is a family of Maricola triclads.
