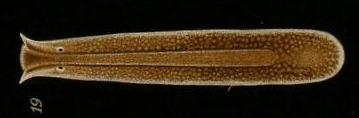
- Procerodes littoralis

Scientific classification
- Kingdom: Animalia
- Phylum: Platyhelminthes
- Order: Tricladida
- Suborder: Maricola
- Superfamily: Procerodoidea; Diesing, 1862
- Family: Procerodidae; Diesing, 1862
- Genus: Procerodes; Girard, 1850

Synonyms
- Debeauchampia Benazzi, 1981

= Procerodes =

Family of flatworms

Procerodes is a genus of marine triclads. It is the only genus in the monotypic family Procerodidae and monotypic superfamily Procerodoidea.

== Ecology ==
Although it is mainly a marine family, specimens living in freshwater have been reported, mainly from the oceanic islands of the Southern Hemisphere.

== Species ==
- Procerodes anatolicus (Benazzi, 1981)
- Procerodes australis Sluys, 1989
- Procerodes dahli Er. Marcus & Ev. Marcus, 1959
- Procerodes dohrni Wilhelmi, 1909
- Procerodes lacteus Ijima & Kaburaki, 1916
- Procerodes littoralis (Strøm, 1768)
- Procerodes lobatus (Schmidt, 1862)
- Procerodes pacificus Hyman, 1954
- Procerodes plebeius (Schmidt, 1861)
- Procerodes variabilis (Bohmig, 1902)
