= Centrovarioplana =

Centrovarioplana tenuis

Scientific classification
- Kingdom: Animalia
- Phylum: Platyhelminthes
- Order: Tricladida
- Superfamily: Cercyroidea
- Family: Centrovarioplanidae; Westbald, 1952
- Genus: Centrovarioplana; Westbald, 1952
- Species: C. tenuis

Binomial name
- Centrovarioplana tenuis Westbald, 1952

Genus of flatworms

Centrovarioplana tenuis is a species of Maricola triclad that is found in Antarctica. It is the only species known in the monotypic genus Centrovarioplana and the family Centrovarioplananidae.
