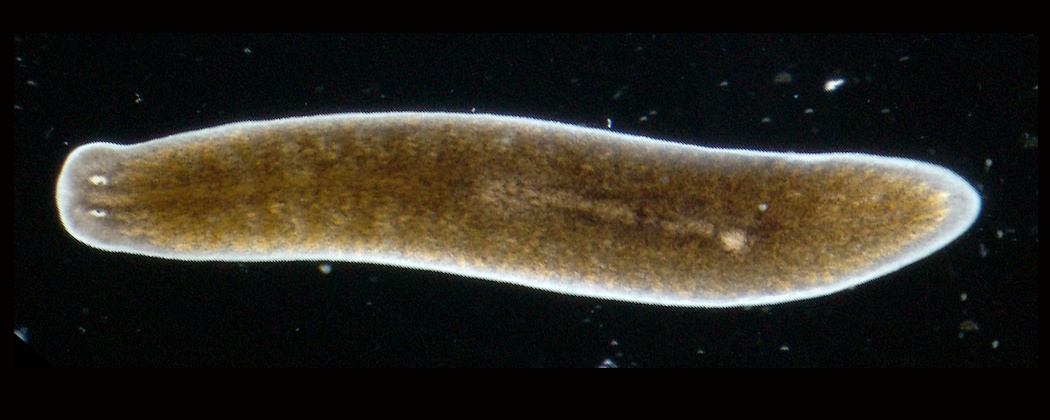
- Planaria torva

Scientific classification
- Kingdom: Animalia
- Phylum: Platyhelminthes
- Order: Tricladida
- Family: Planariidae
- Genus: Planaria; O. F. Müller, 1776

= Planaria =

Genus of flatworms

Planaria is a genus of planarians in the family Planariidae. Due to its excellent ability to regenerate, species of Planaria have also been used as model organisms in regeneration studies. When an individual is cut into pieces, each piece has the ability to regenerate into a fully formed individual. When decapitated, they retain their memories.

== Description ==
Currently the genus Planaria is defined as freshwater triclads with oviducts that unite to form a common oviduct without embracing the bursa copulatrix and with an adenodactyl present in the male atrium. The testes occur along the whole body.

Planaria originally have habitats in dark, murky water which results in such sensitivity (Paskin et al., 2014). They are also sensitive to other stimuli such as chemical gradients, vibration, magnetic and electric fields (Deochand et al., 2018). Their central nervous system includes the anterior (head, brain and eyes) and middle (abdominal trunk and pharynx) (Deochand et al., 2018).

== Diet ==
The food of Planaria species includes freshwater gastropods, tubificid worms, and freshwater arthropods, such as isopods of the genus Asellus and chironomid larvae. In the United Kingdom, P. torva is a successful predator of the invasive New Zealand mud snail (Potamopyrgus jenkinsi).

== Species ==
The following species are recognised in the genus Planaria:

- Planaria adhaerens Korotneff, 1909
- Planaria albocingata Korotneff, 1912
- Planaria barroisi Whitehouse, 1914
- Planaria bicingulata Korotneff, 1912
- Planaria chulunginensis Sabussow, 1903
- Planaria cincinata Korotneff, 1912
- Planaria cinerea Stimpson, 1857
- Planaria dagarensis Sabussow, 1903
- Planaria debilis Korotneff, 1912
- Planaria delineata Korotneff, 1912
- Planaria dybouskyi Sabussow, 1903
- Planaria flava Delle Chiaje, 1822
- Planaria fontana Schrank, 1803
- Planaria fuliginosa Leidy, 1851
- Planaria fuliginosus Leidy, 1851
- Planaria fulvifrons Grube, 1872
- Planaria fuscomaculata Korotneff, 1912
- Planaria gigas Leuckart, 1828
- Planaria grubii Sabussow, 1903
- Planaria ignorata Raspail, 1902
- Planaria incerta Korotneff, 1912
- Planaria kempi Whitehouse, 1913
- Planaria lemani (du Plessis, 1874) Graff, 1876
- Planaria lucta Korotneff, 1912
- Planaria luteola Delle Chiaje, 1822
- Planaria macrocephala Fries, 1879
- Planaria maculata Dalyell, 1853
- Planaria marmorosa Müller, 1776
- Planaria melanocerca Korotneff, 1912
- Planaria melanopunctata Korotneff, 1912
- Planaria melanotorquis Korotneff, 1912
- Planaria nesidensis Delle Chiaje, 1822
- Planaria onegensis Sabussow, 1903
- Planaria punctatum Carus, 1863
- Planaria rosea Müller OF, 1773
- Planaria rothii Braun, 1884
- Planaria sabussowi Korotneff, 1912
- Planaria savignyi Leuckart, 1828
- Planaria semifasciata Korotneff, 1912
- Planaria simplex Woodworth, 1896
- Planaria sinensis Stimpson, 1857
- Planaria subflava Korotneff, 1912
- Planaria torva (Müller OF, 1773)
- Planaria tremellaris Grube, 1840
- Planaria unionicola Woodworth, 1897
- Planaria verrucosa Delle Chiaje, 1829
- Planaria wytegrensis Sabussow, 1907
- Planaria zeylanica Kelaart, 1858

== Application of planaria in research ==
Planaria's use as an ethical and cost-effective alternative to vertebrate testing makes it commonly used in toxicology, neuroscience, and pharmacology. Planaria’s simple nervous system, high sensitivity to environmental changes, low maintenance in laboratory settings and well-characterized genome make them particularly useful for studying chemical toxicity, wound healing, and neuro-regeneration. In pharmacology and neuroscience, planaria are used to study the effects of psychoactive compounds, including investigations into drug addiction and withdrawal responses. In drug delivery studies, they are sometimes used to assess the bio-compatibility and potential irritancy of pharmaceutical formulations Additionally, their ability to regenerate lost body parts also makes them a common model for stem cell research.

Using advanced genetic analysis (phylogenomics), scientists confirmed that the family of land planarians, Geoplanidae, is divided into two main sister groups (clades):

One group consists of the subfamilies Bipaliinae and Microplaninae.

The other group consists of Rhynchodeminae and Geoplaninae.
