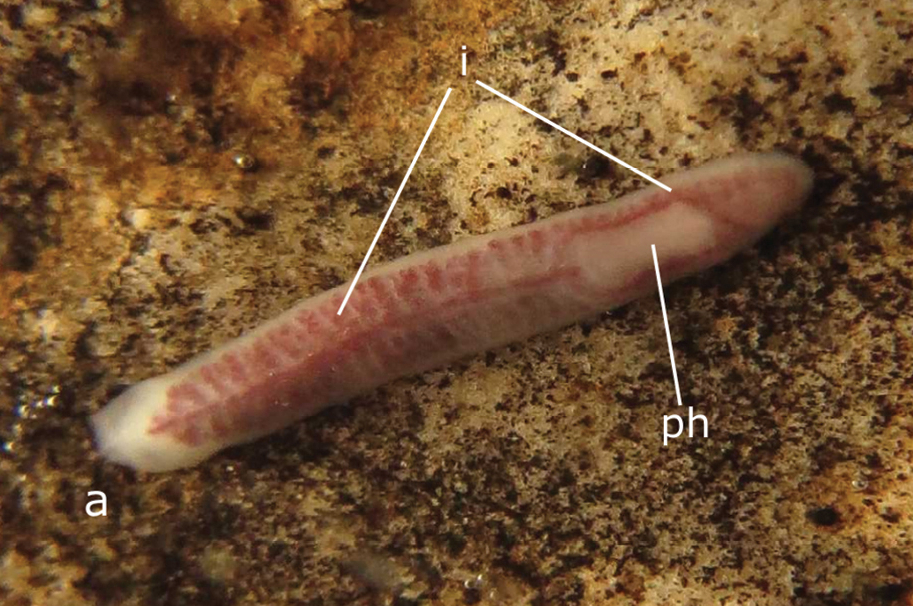

Scientific classification
- Kingdom: Animalia
- Phylum: Platyhelminthes
- Order: Tricladida
- Infraorder: Cavernicola
- Genus: Hausera; Leal-Zanchet & Souza, 2014
- Species: H. hauseri

Binomial name
- Hausera hauseri Leal-Zanchet & Souza, 2014
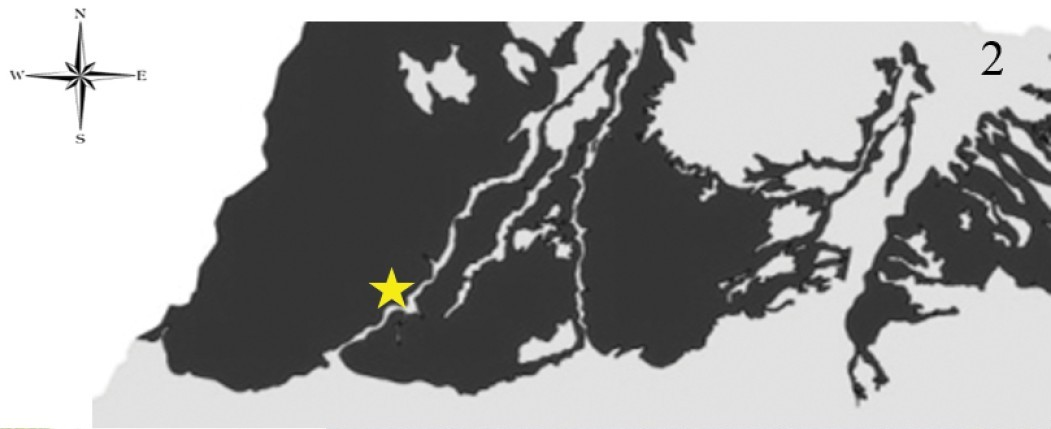
- Location in Rio Grande do Norte

= Hausera =

Hausera hauseri

Genus of flatworms

Hausera is a subterranean genus of planarian from Brazil. It contains only the single species Hausera hauseri. It is the first cave-dwelling member of the suborder Cavernicola to have been observed in South America.

== Etymology ==
Both the genus and species were named after Josef Hauser, a researcher of freshwater flatworms.

== Description ==
Specimens are 7.5 millimetres (0.30 in) long and 2 millimetres (0.079 in) wide. The pharynx is 0.9 millimetres (0.035 in) long, and along with the gonopore is located in the hindmost third of the body. While it lacks eyes, the head has a pair of ciliated sensory organs approximately 140 μm back from the body's anterior end. The intestine extends into the brain and connects with the reproductive system via a genito-intestinal duct. The testicular follicles are arranged in uneven rows near the margins of the body, and the ovaries are located behind but in proximity to the brain, approximately 0.6 millimeters behind the body's tip. The species is colorless.

== Range and habitat ==
Hausera hauseri was found in a perennial stream in Crotes cave, part of the Lagedo do Rosário cave system in Felipe Guerra, Brazil. The water in the stream was 10 centimetres (3.9 in) to 15 centimetres (5.9 in) deep.
