= Rhabdites =

Scientific classification
- Kingdom: Animalia
- Phylum: Mollusca
- Class: Cephalopoda
- Order: †Orthocerida
- Genus: †Rhabdites

Rhabdites is an extinct genus of orthocerids, a kind of straight-shelled nautiloid cephalopod.
