= Fuji Women's University =

Private university in Sapporo, Japan

Coordinates: 43°4′48.3″N 141°21′2.1″E

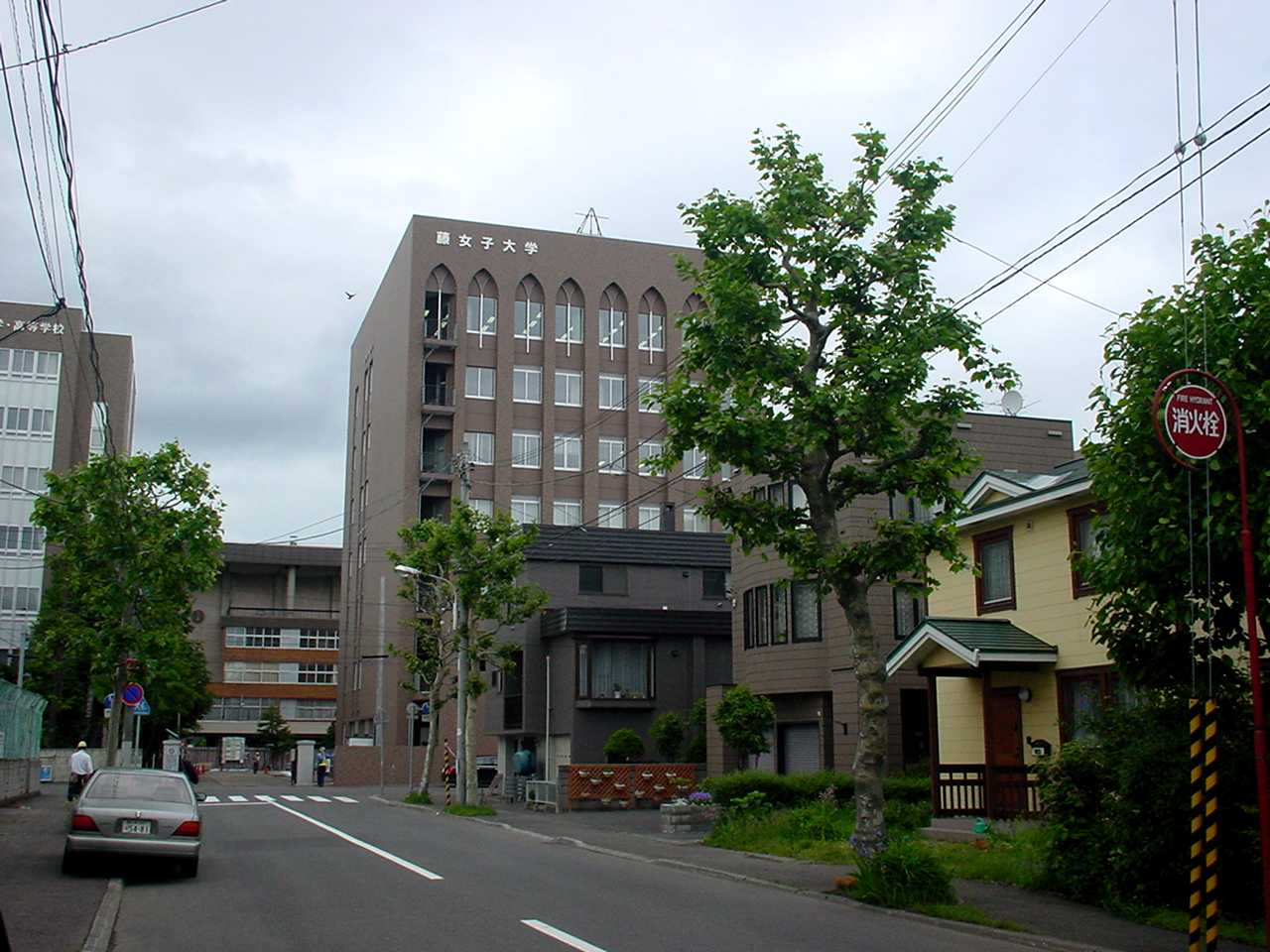
Fuji Women's University

Fuji Women's University (藤女子大学, Fuji joshi daigaku) is a private university in Sapporo, Hokkaido, Japan.

== History ==
The predecessor of the school was founded in 1925, and it was chartered as a university in 1961. The university was founded by three Sisters of St. Francis of the Martyr St. George after an appeal from the first parish chief, Bishop Wenseslaus Kinold of the Sapporo Catholic diocese.

== Academics ==
Fuji Women's University consists of two faculties: the Faculty of Humanities and the Faculty of Human Life Sciences. In addition, there is the Graduate School of Human Life Sciences.

It has two campuses: one in the northern part of Sapporo several blocks from Hokkaido University and another in Ishikari-shi in the suburbs of Sapporo.

According to an article in the November 22, 2013 issue of the Nihon Keizai Newspaper, the university ranked third among 26 universities in Hokkaido.
