= Alphonse Malaquin =

Alphonse Malaquin (24 October 1868 – 22 April 1949) was a French zoologist born in the village of Cambrésis. He is known for his research of Polychaeta (class of annelids).

In 1888 he began work as an assistant at the zoological laboratory at the Faculté des Sciences in Lille. In 1895 he defended his doctorate with a highly regarded thesis on the annelid family Syllidae, titled Recherches sur les Syllidiens. Morphologie. Anatomie Reproduction. Développement.

In 1906 he attained the chair of general and applied zoology at Lille, and during the following years established a laboratory and museum of applied zoology. During World War I both facilities sustained extensive damage, with restoration and re-installation taking several years to complete, the museum being reopened to the public as late as 1925. In 1919 Malaquin was named chevalier of the Legion d'Honneur, and in 1937 became an officer (year of retirement).

A species of monstrillid copepod known as Cymbasoma malaquini (Caullery & Mesnil, 1914) is named after him.
