= Rock Bridge Memorial State Park =

State park in Missouri, United States

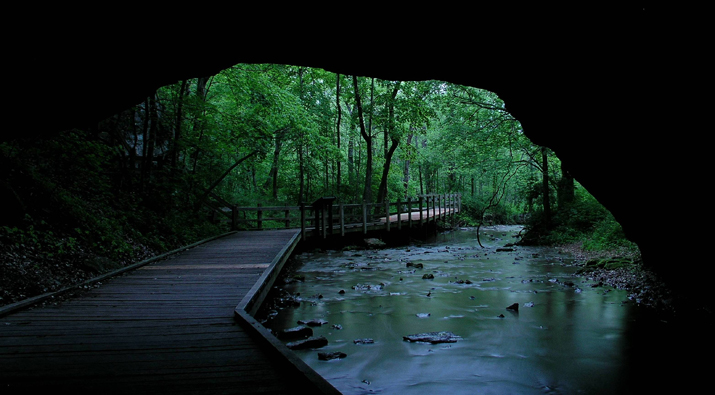
- Rock Bridge in 2006

- Location within Missouri Location within the United States
- Location: Boone County, Missouri, United States
- Coordinates: 38°52′21″N 92°19′33″W
- Area: 2,272.83 acres (919.78 ha)
- Elevation: 617 ft (188 m)
- Established: 1967
- Administrator: Missouri Department of Natural Resources
- Visitors: 587,200 (in 2023)
- Website: Official website

Rock Bridge Memorial State Park is a geological preserve and public recreation area encompassing 2,273 acres (920 ha), five miles (8.0 km) south of Columbia in Boone County, Missouri off of Missouri Route 163. The state park is home to 12 caves and is noted for its excellent examples of karst landforms including the rock bridge, sinkholes, and an underground stream at the cave known as Devil's Icebox. The rock bridge was created by the collapse of a section of a cave which resulted in a small arch of rock being left to form a natural bridge over the creek. The park is the only known home of Kenkia glandulosa, a flatworm commonly known as the pink planarian.

== History ==
Throughout the 1800s, the Devil's Icebox stream that flows through the rock bridge was a power source for settlers, with a stone dam being built to harness the power to operate a gristmill. In 1834, the first paper mill west of the Mississippi River was built at the site, then a whiskey distillery was built in 1847. Later, a blacksmith, stores, homes, and roads made up the historical community of Rockbridge Mills, also known as Pierpont.

Although privately owned, the area was open to the public for more than a century and became a gathering place for people in the surrounding area. In 1961, a University of Missouri professor, Lew Stoerker's, nine-year-old daughter, Carol Louise, was killed in a hit-and-run accident. In order to memorialize her and create a safe area for children, the state park opened in 1967.

== Activities and amenities ==
The boardwalk on the Devil's Icebox Trail gives access to the park's primary karst features and the opening at Connor's Cave. Park trails are available for hiking and cycling, and horseback riding is offered in the 750-acre (300 ha) Gans Creek Wild Area.

== See also ==
- Three Creeks Conservation Area
- Gans Creek Recreation Area
