= Edward R. Foreman =

American meteorologist

- Born: 1808
- Died: 1885 (aged 76–77)
- Scientific career
- Fields: Meteorology
- Institutions: University of Pennsylvania; Smithsonian Institution; National Medical College; United States National Museum

Edward R. Foreman (1808–1885) was an American meteorologist.

== Biography ==
Foreman was born on 1808, in Baltimore, Maryland. He was an assistant professor for 12 years at the University of Pennsylvania. In 1848, he was hired as an assistant for the Smithsonian Institution. His job at Smithsonian was to organize meteorological reports, and arranging of scientific lectures, under a supervision by secretary Joseph Henry. While being employed at the Smithsonian, he also served as professor of chemistry in the National Medical College. He got a job of chief examiner in the Patent office in 1852, a position he kept till 1860. In 1874, he came back to Smithsonian as a collaborator in ethnology from the United States National Museum.
