= Devil's Icebox (cave) =

Cave in Missouri, U.S.

Coordinates: 38°52′12″N 92°19′36″W

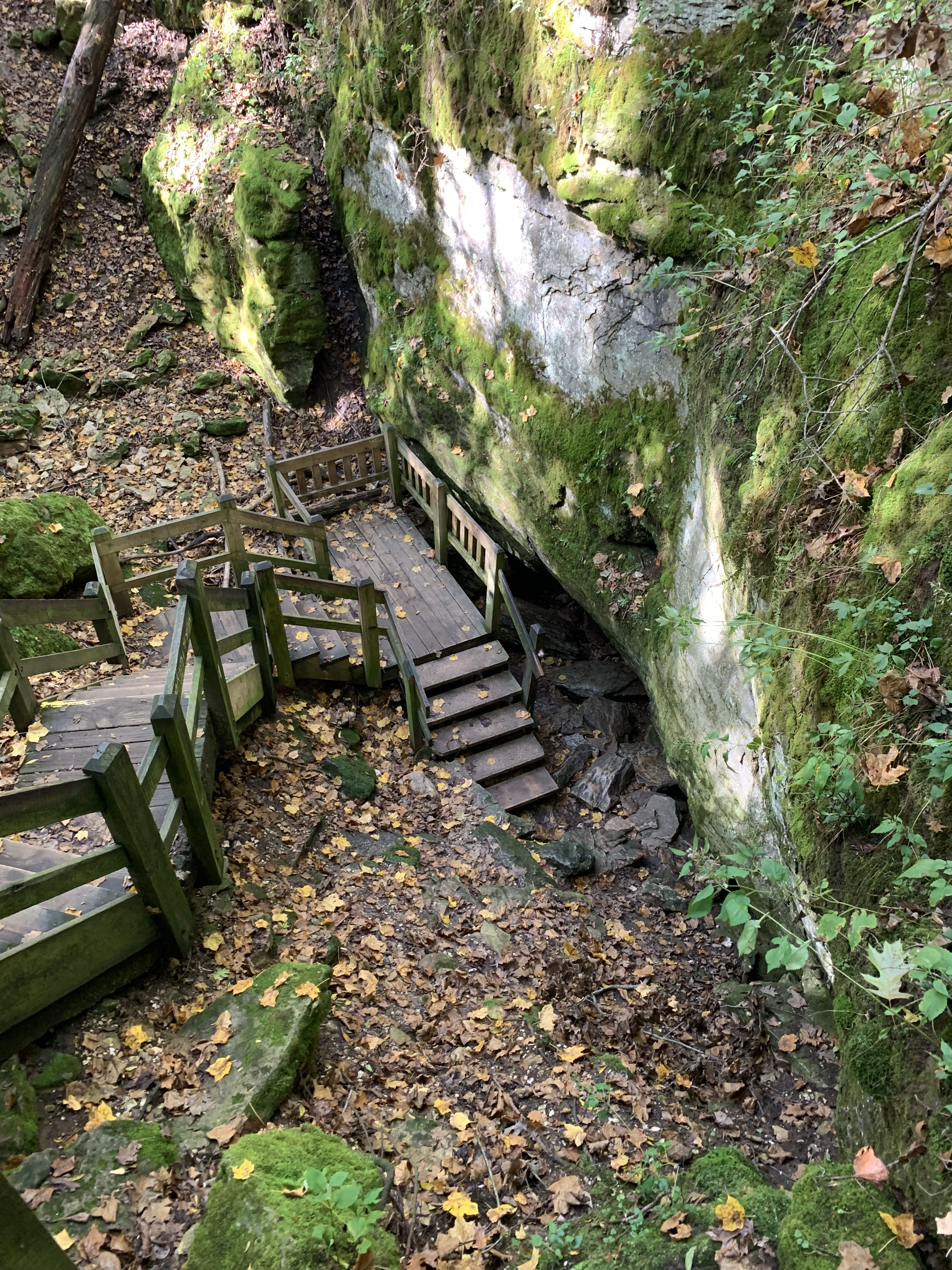
- Interactive map of Devil's Icebox
- Geology: Limestone
- Entrances: 1
- Show cave length: 7 miles (11 km)

Devil's Icebox is a cave in Rock Bridge Memorial State Park in Columbia, Missouri. It is said to be one of the longest caves in the state of Missouri and is one of the caves with the highest number of species in the state. It is currently closed to protect the endangered Indiana bat, and is the only known natural home of Kenkia glandulosa (the pink planarian).

== Name ==
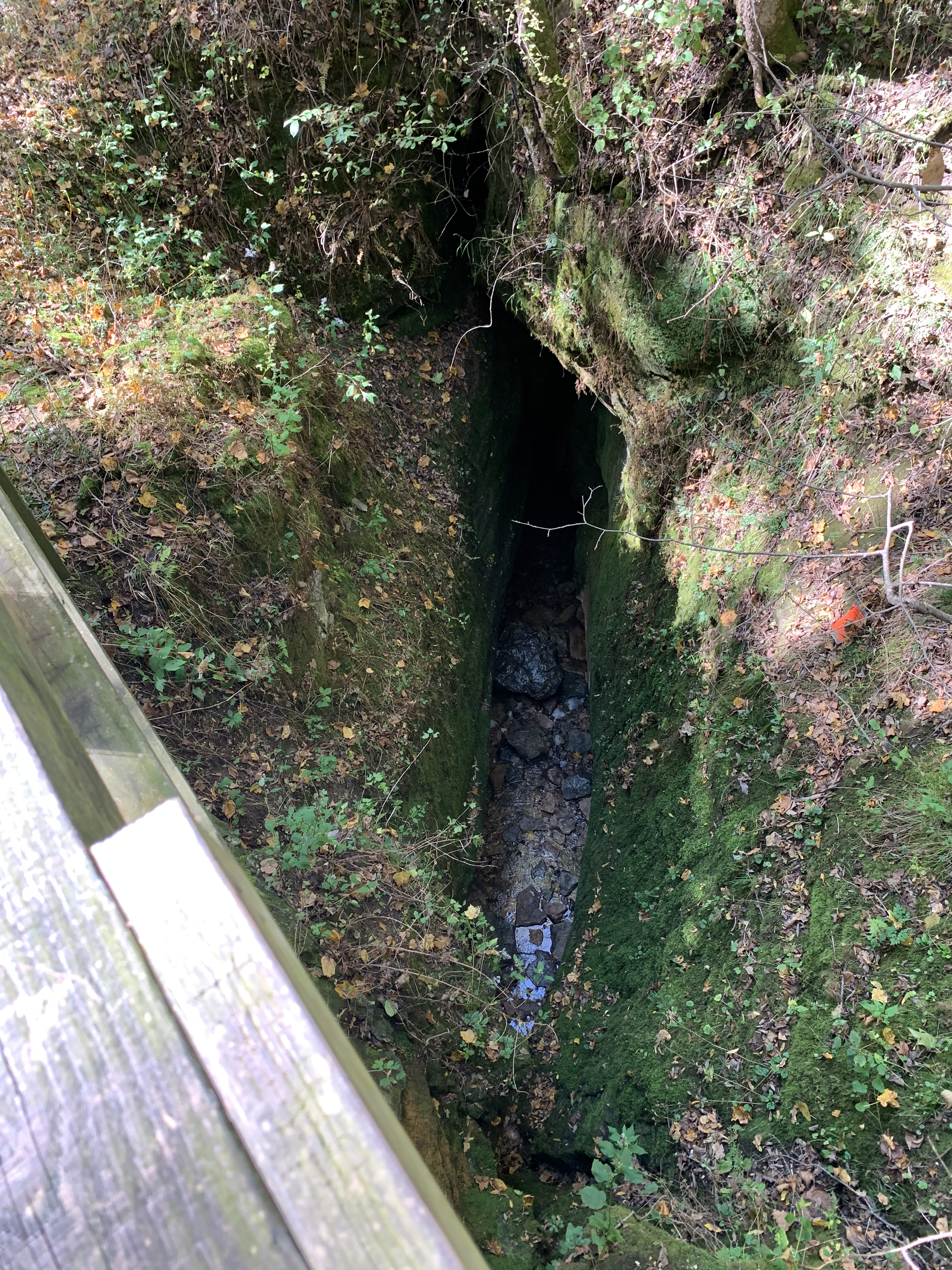

The cave was probably given the name Devil's Icebox by people living in area during the early 1800s. The word icebox in the name probably came from the very cold air that leaks from the cave all year. In 1926, the name of the cave was printed in an article about the earliest exploration of the cave in 1924.

== History ==
The stream that flows through Devil's Icebox Cave was a source of power for settlers in the 19th century.

The earliest exploration of the cave took place in 1924. A man named Ben M. Yates claimed he was the first one to explore that cave, he along with his sons went into the cave with a john-long boat and other items. They were said to have explored the cave for 24 hours and traveled 5 miles.

Access to the cave was restricted in 2006. Then in 2010, tours to the general public stopped to protect the bats from white-nose syndrome. Despite this, the disease affected the caves in Rock Bridge during 2013.

== Characteristics ==
=== Temperature ===
The cave maintains a temperature of 13 °C (55.4 °F).

=== Species ===
According to the U.S. Government Printing Office, Devil's Icebox has the second highest number of species out of the over 6000 caves in Missouri. In 2007, 80 species have been identified in the cave.

It is the only place where the planarian Kenkia glandulosa has been found; the rarity of this species was once used as an argument to prevent the construction of a shopping mall in the area. The cave is also home to species of salamanders, frogs, troglobites, millipede, spiders, and springtail. The Indiana bat, northern long-eared bat, and gray bat use the cave as a summer and/or winter roost.

=== Length ===
It is considered the seventh or sixth longest cave in Missouri. A survey made in 1986 yielded an estimate of 5.76 miles (9.27 km).

=== Geology ===
The cave is a double sink hole. It was formed in Burlington Limestone which had formed 300 million years ago. The cave itself formed 25 million years ago, and is an example of Karst Topography. According to J Harlen Bretz, Devil's Icebox is a phreatic cave system.

In January 1994, a stream in the cave was oversaturated with calcite and dolomite. In 2017 stalagmites in the cave were studied. All the water flowing in the cave is from the surface.
