= Seidlia (flatworm) =

Scientific classification
- Kingdom: Animalia
- Phylum: Platyhelminthes
- Order: Tricladida
- Family: Planariidae
- Genus: Seidlia; Zabusov, 1911

Synonyms
- Rjabuschinskya Zabusov, 1916

Genus of flatworms

Seidlia is a genus of planarians in the family Planariidae. The genus was described in 1911 by Zabusov.

== Species ==
The following species are recognised in the genus Seidlia:

- Seidlia akkeshi (Ichikawa & Kawakatsu, 1963)
- Seidlia almaatina Zabusova, 1947
- Seidlia auriculata (Ijima & Kaburaki, 1916)
- Seidlia elongata (Zabusova, 1929)
- Seidlia eurantron Zabusova, 1936
- Seidlia gracilis Zabusova, 1936
- Seidlia hamica Liu, 1996
- Seidlia lactea Zabusova, 1936
- Seidlia relicta Zabusova, 1936
- Seidlia remota (Smith, 1988)
- Seidlia sabussowi Seidl, 1911
- Seidlia schmidti Zabusov, 1916
- Seidlia sierrensis (Kenk, 1973)
- Seidlia stummeri Zabusova, 1936
