= Ludwig Böhmig =

Austrian zoologist (1858–1948)

Ludwig Böhmig (8 August 1858 – 5 January 1948) was an Austrian zoologist and platyhelminthologist born in Niederebersbach in the Kingdom of Saxony.

Böhmig was a professor at the University of Graz, where he was a long-time collaborator of zoologist Ludwig von Graff (1851–1924). From 1920 to 1929 he was director of the zoological institute at Graz.

He specialized in anatomical and histological studies of Turbellaria and Nemertea, and is credited with providing taxonomic nomenclature for a number of flatworm/nemertine species. The species Convoluta bohmigi (Brauner, 1920) and Hypoblepharina boehmigi (Karling, 1973) are named after him.

== Written works ==
- Die Turbellaria acoela der Plankton-expedition, 1895
- Beitrage zur Anatomie und Histologie der Nemertinen (Contributions to the anatomy and histology of nemertines, 1898
- Turbellarien, 1908
- Die Zelle (morphologie und vermehrung), 1920.
