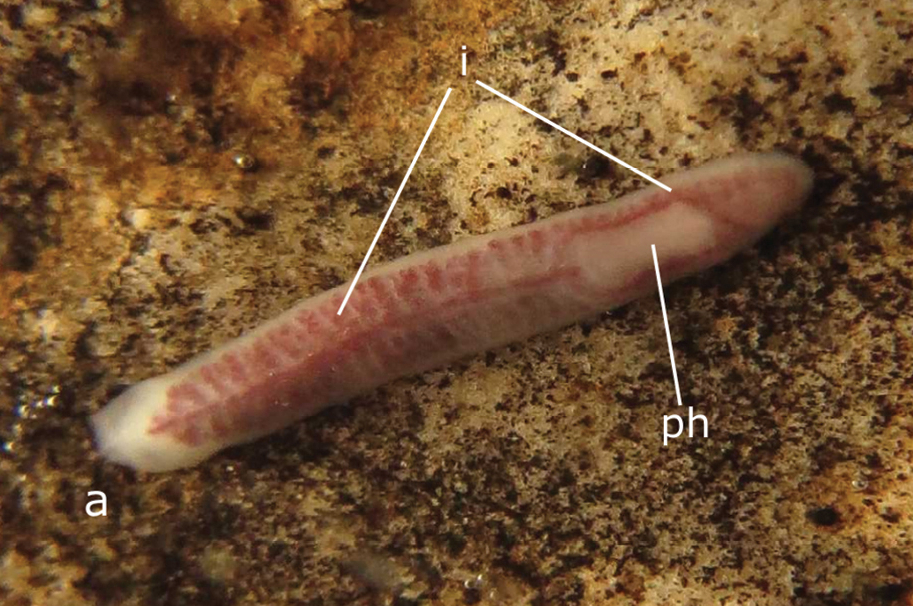
- Hausera hauseri

Scientific classification
- Kingdom: Animalia
- Phylum: Platyhelminthes
- Order: Tricladida
- Infraorder: Cavernicola; Sluys, 1990
- Family: Dimarcusidae; Mitchell & Kawakatsu, 1972

Genera
- See text

= Dimarcusidae =

Family of flatworms

Dimarcusidae is a family of triclads found mostly in freshwater habitats of caves, although at least one species, Rhodax evelinae, occurs in surface waters. Currently the family contains only seven species distributed in five genera, although the total number of species is thought to be much higher.

== Description ==
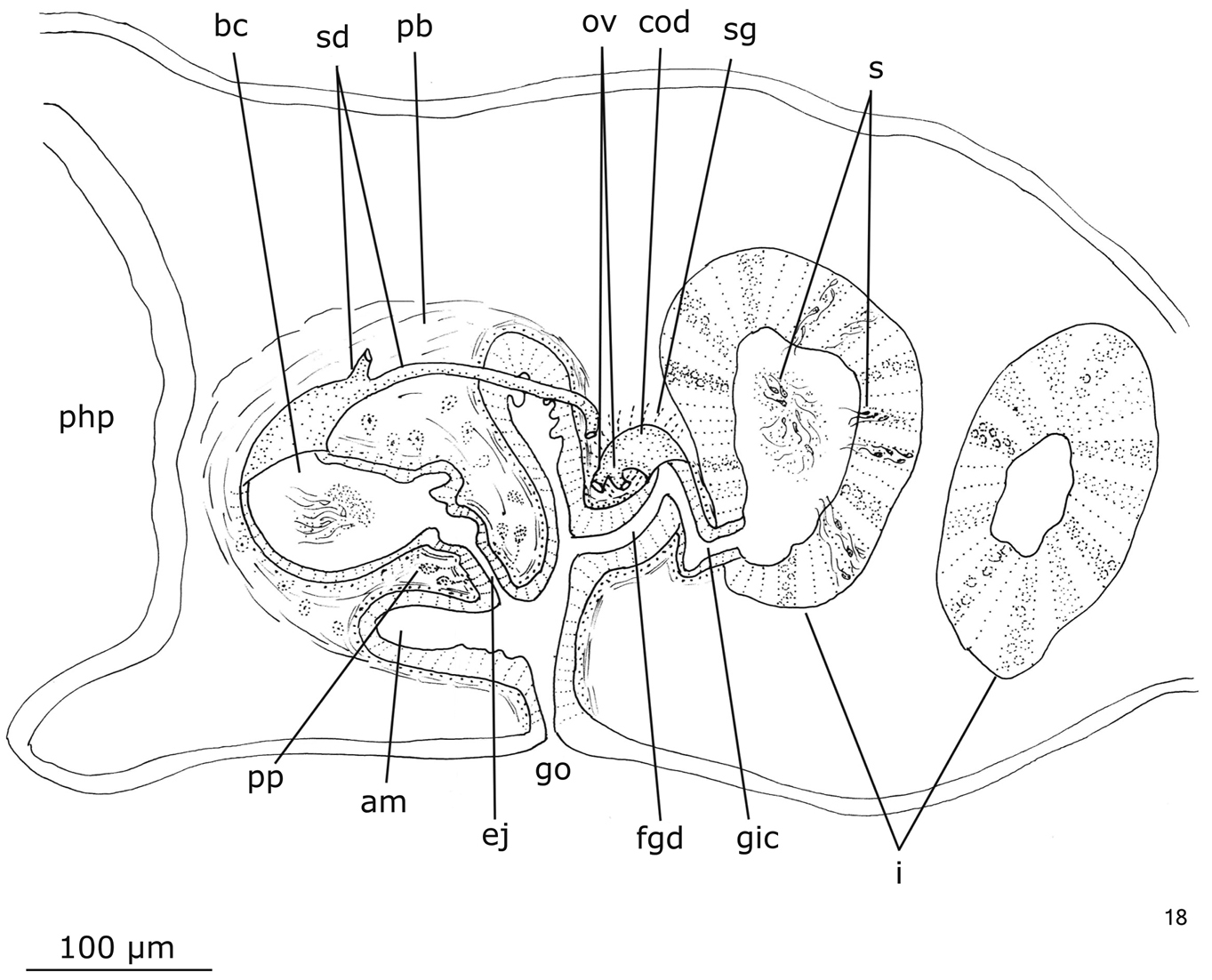
Copulatory apparatus of Hausera hauseri showing the common ovovitelline duct (cod) perpendicular to the female genital duct (dgf)

The morphological features uniting species of Dimarcusidae are related to the reproductive system. Their ovaries are located more posteriorly than in most triclads, which usually have them close to the brain. The penis in species of Dimarcusidae contains glandular elements and the common ovovitelline duct is perpendicular to the female genital duct.

== Taxonomy ==
The family Dimarcusidae was erected in 1972 by Mitchell and Kawakatsu to include a new species, Dimarcus villalobosi. However, the same species had been briefly described by Benazzi in the same year as Opisthobursa mexicana and this name had priority, with Dimarcus villalobosi becoming a junior synonym. As a result, the family is called Dimarcusidae despite the absence of a valid genus Dimarcus.

== Phylogeny ==
Historically, species of Dimarcusidae have been classified as members of the suborders Maricola (marine triclads) or Paludicola (freshwater triclads). They received their own suborder, Cavernicola, in 1990, although their relationship to other triclads had not been settled. Recent molecular studies, however, suggest that Cavernicola is the sister group of Maricola, thus being more closely related to marine than to freshwater triclads.

The Dimarcusidae family, within the order Tricladida, has been the subject of phylogenetic studies to elucidate its evolutionary relationships. A comprehensive analysis by Sluys (1990) examined the phylogenetic relationships among genera within Dimarcusidae, highlighting the monophyletic grouping of certain genera. Additionally, molecular analyses using genes such as COI and ITS-1 have been employed to resolve taxonomic statuses and infer phylogenetic positions within the family.

== Genera ==
Currently the family Dimarcusidae includes the following five genera:

- Balliania Gourbault, 1978
- Kawakatsua Sluys, 2019
- Novomitchellia Özdikmen, 2010
- Opisthobursa Benazzi, 1972
- Rhodax Marcus, 1946
