= Masaharu Kawakatsu =

Japanese zoologist (born 1929)

- 川勝 正治
- Born: January 20, 1929 (age 97); Kameoka, Japan
- Education: Kyoto University of Education
- Scientific career
- Fields: Zoology, Helminthology
- Workplaces: Fuji Women's University
- Author abbrev. (zoology): Kawakatsu

Masaharu Kawakatsu (川勝 正治, Kawakatsu Masaharu; born January 20, 1929) is a Japanese zoologist known for his studies on the taxonomy and ecology of planarians.

== Life ==
Masaharu Kawakatsu was born in 1929 in the Asahi village, Kameoka town, Kyoto Prefecture, Japan, son of Masakazu Kawakatsu, a squire of the village, and Tei Kawakatsu (born Okajima), the daughter of a country medical doctor, Ei'ichi Okajima.

After his mother died of an acute pneumonia when he was 7 years old, Kawakatsu became closer to his maternal grandfather, who had a passion for sciences, and learned from him the names of many plants and animals that grew around the house, including their scientific names. In April 1941, he attended the Sonobe Middle School and joined a Natural History Club.

In 1946, he started his studies at the Kyoto Normal College (currently Kyoto University of Education), at the time an education organization for teachers. There, he was a member of the biology study group. In 1948, biology students and professors of 5 normal colleges in the Kinki Region organized the Association of Biology Club. There he met Dr. Hisao Sugino, a professor of biology of the Osaka Normal College, whose main theme of academic studies was the analysis of planarian regeneration.

In 1950, the Kyoto Normal College was renamed Kyoto Gakugei University and Kawakatsu returned to the institution as a student of natural science and met professor Kazunosuke I. Okugawa, who studied the taxonomy and fauna of microturbellarians from Lake Biwa. In the spring of 1951, Kawakatsu became a private helper of Prof. Okugawa in his research on the sexual induction in asexual forms of Japanese freshwater planarians. He graduated in 1953 and became an assistant at the same university, starting to study planarians, remaining in the institution until 1961. He married his wife, Kazuko Hatano, on 5 January 1959.

In the beginning of April, 1961, Kawakatsu moved to the Fuji Women's College in Sapporo to work as an associate professor of biology, remaining until 1966. Although attaining nearly 12 classes per week, Kawakatsu used his spare time to study the taxonomy of freshwater planarians from Japan and neighboring countries. During this time, he met Dr. Libbie Hyman and they became good friends. In 1965, being weak to the advancing age (76), Hyman asked Kawakatsu to continue her work and sent him her collection of planarians collected in Lake Tahoe, California.

After attending at the Libbie Henrietta Hyman Memorial Symposium in December, 1970, Chicago, Kawakatsu started a series of cooperative studies with other researchers. He studied the planarian fauna of Mexican caves with Robert W. Mitchell and the taxonomy and karyology of South American freshwater planarians with Josef Hauser, visiting Unisinos in Brazil in 1979.

In 1987, Kawakatsu began a series of publications in association with Dr. Robert E. Ogren from Wilkes University, entitled the "Land Planarian Indices Series" where they reviewed the taxonomy of all land planarian species known at the time.
