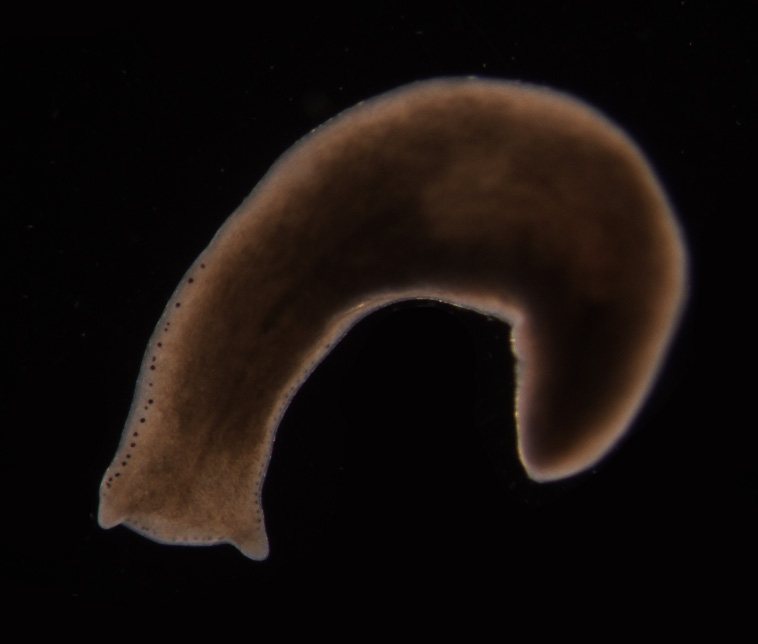
- Polycelis felina

Scientific classification
- Kingdom: Animalia
- Phylum: Platyhelminthes
- Order: Tricladida
- Superfamily: Planarioidea
- Family: Planariidae; Stimpson, 1857

Genera
- See text

= Planariidae =

Family of flatworms

Planariidae is a family of freshwater planarians.

The type genus is Planaria Müller, 1776.

== Genera ==
Twelve genera of Planariidae are known:

- Atrioplanaria
- Bdellasimilis
- Crenobia
- Digonoporus
- Hymanella
- Ijimia
- Paraplanaria
- Phagocata
- Plagnolia
- Planaria
- Polycelis
- Seidlia

== Phylogeny ==
Phylogenetic supertree after Sluys et al., 2009:

- Tricladida
  - Maricola
  - - Cavernicola
    - Continenticola
      - Planarioidea
        - Planariidae
        - - Kenkiidae
          - Dendrocoelidae
      - Geoplanoidea
        - Dugesiidae
        - Geoplanidae
