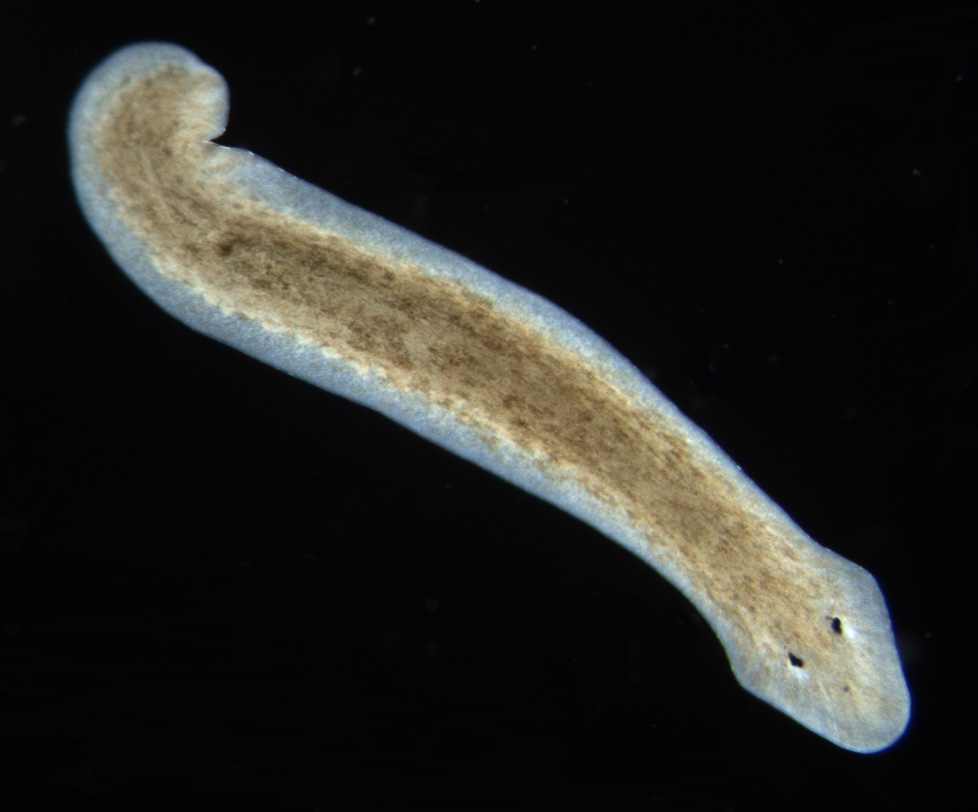
- Dugesia subtentaculata, a dugesiid.

Scientific classification
- Kingdom: Animalia
- Phylum: Platyhelminthes
- Subphylum: Rhabditophora
- Order: Tricladida; Lang, 1884

Subdivisions
- Suborder Continenticola; Suborder Maricola; Suborder Cavernicola

= Planarian =

Planarian Temporal range: Present, 299–0 Ma (Possible cambrian record, 508 mya)

Flatworms of the Turbellaria class

Unidentified planarian

A planarian (also known as a triclad; plural planarians or planaria) is a free-living flatworm of the order Tricladida. Planarians occur in marine, freshwater, and terrestrial environments, and the order is divided into the suborders Maricola, Cavernicola, and Continenticola.

Planarians are bilaterian flatworms that lack a fluid-filled body cavity and have a three-branched intestine with one anterior and two posterior branches. They lack circulatory and respiratory systems, absorbing oxygen through the body wall, and move using cilia and muscular contractions. Depending on the species, planarians reproduce sexually, asexually through fission, or by both methods.

Planarians are best known for their ability to regenerate missing tissues and organs, a process enabled by abundant adult stem cells called neoblasts. Neoblasts can self-renew and generate the cell types needed for regeneration and tissue maintenance. Because of these regenerative abilities and their relatively simple anatomy, planarians are widely used as model organisms in studies of regeneration, stem cells, aging, toxicology, genetics, and memory.

== Phylogeny and taxonomy ==
=== Phylogeny ===
Phylogenetic supertree after Sluys et al., 2009:

- Tricladida
  - Maricola
  - - Cavernicola
    - Continenticola
      - Planarioidea
        - Planariidae
        - - Kenkiidae
          - Dendrocoelidae
      - Geoplanoidea
        - Dugesiidae
        - Geoplanidae

=== Taxonomy ===
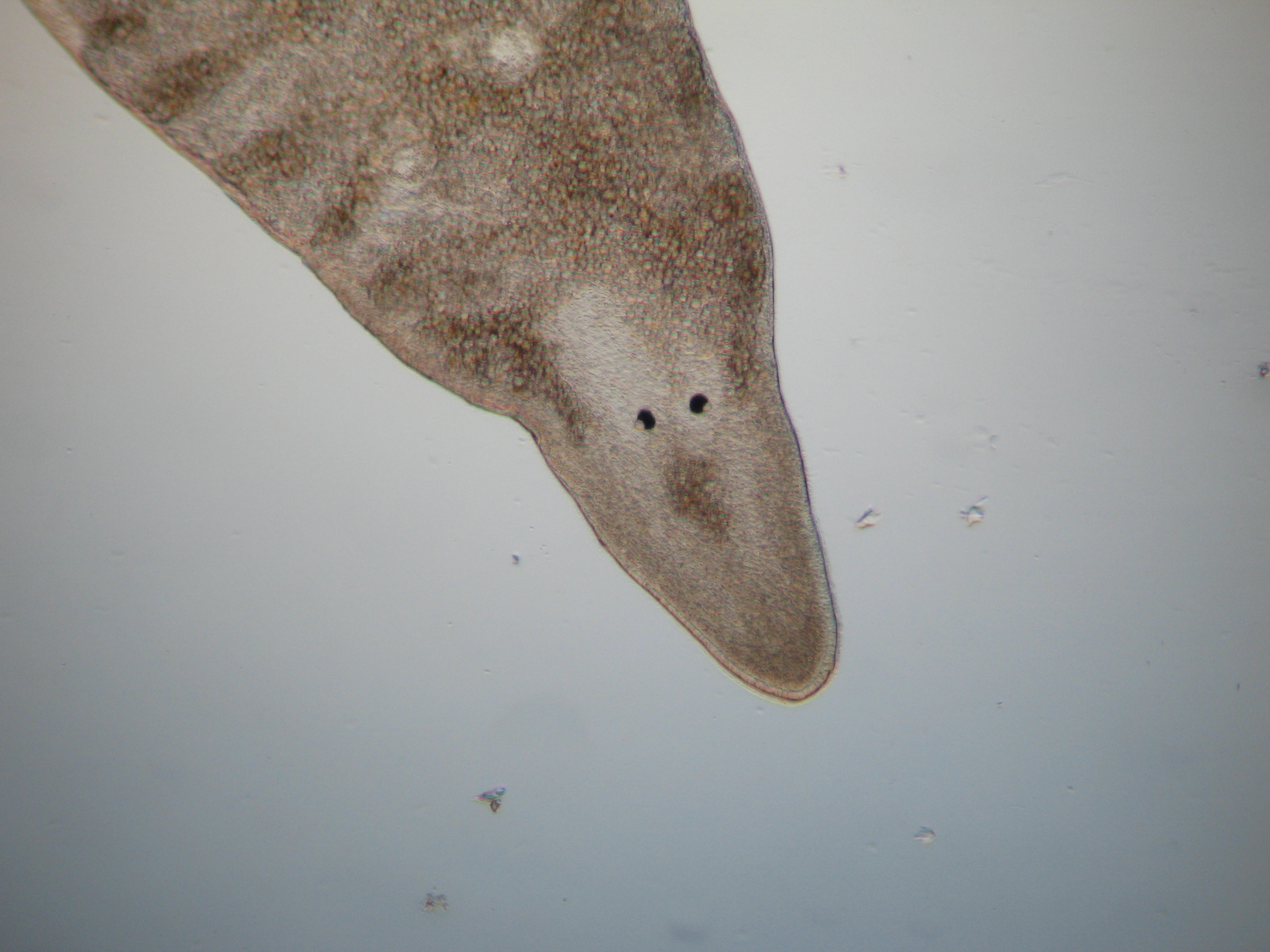
Sabussowia ronaldi, a Maricola.

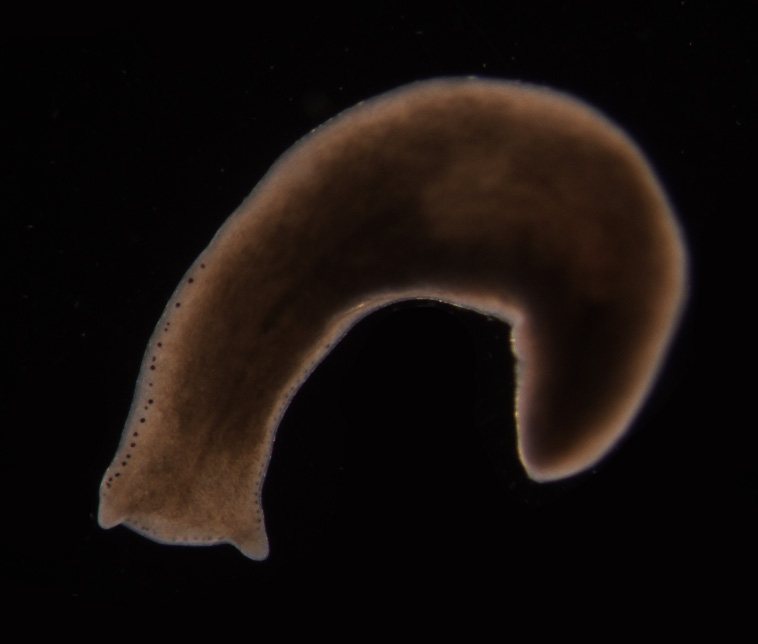
Polycelis felina, a planariid.

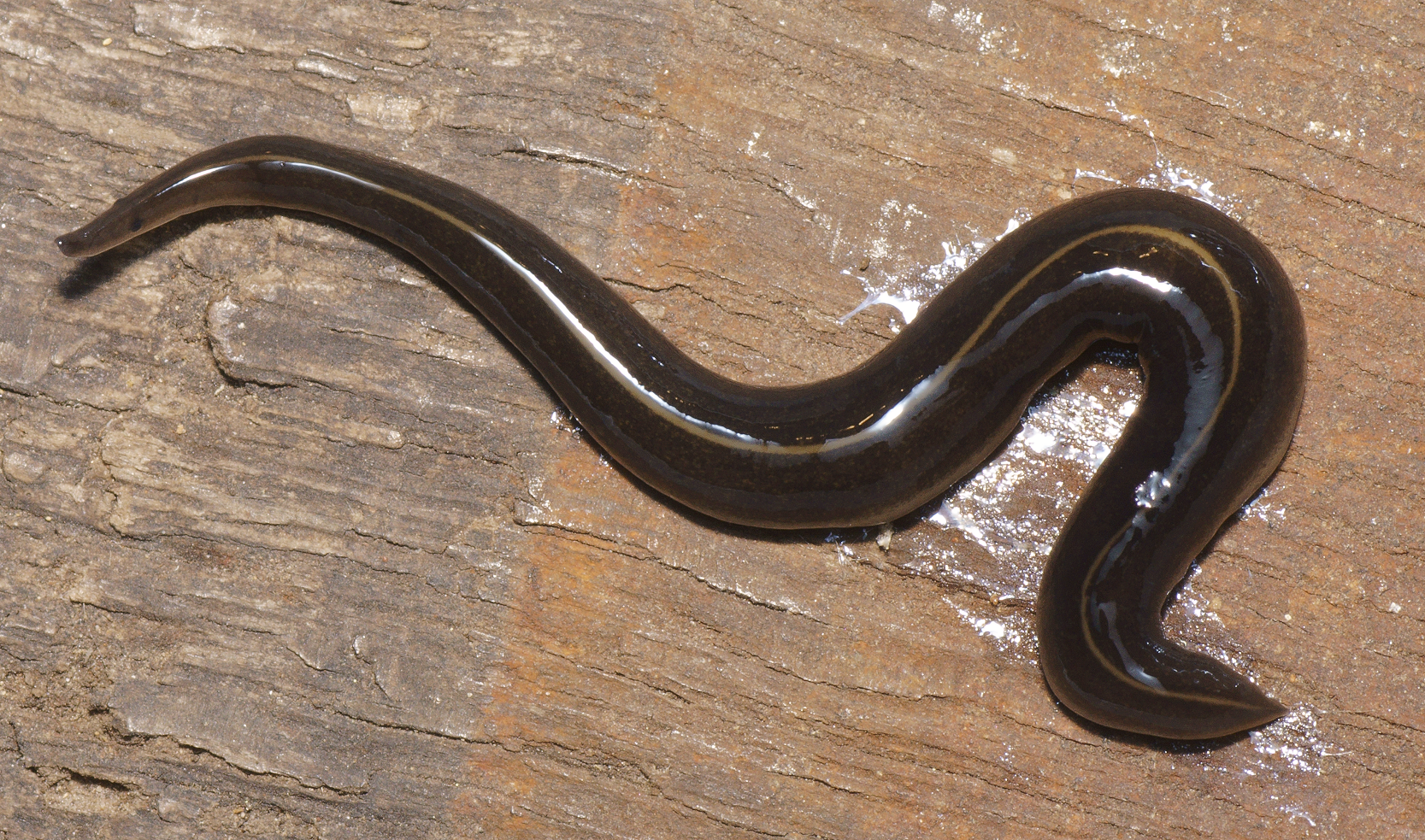
Platydemus manokwari, a geoplanid.

Linnaean ranks after Sluys et al., 2009:

- Order Tricladida
  - Suborder Maricola
    - Superfamily Cercyroidea
      - Family Centrovarioplanidae
      - Family Cercyridae
      - Family Meixnerididae
    - Superfamily Bdellouroidea
      - Family Uteriporidae
      - Family Bdellouridae
    - Superfamily Procerodoidea
      - Family Procerodidae
  - Suborder Cavernicola
    - Family Dimarcusidae
  - Suborder Continenticola
    - Superfamily Planarioidea
      - Family Planariidae
      - Family Dendrocoelidae
      - Family Kenkiidae
    - Superfamily Geoplanoidea
      - Family Dugesiidae
      - Family Geoplanidae

== Anatomy and physiology ==
Planarians are bilaterian flatworms that lack a fluid-filled body cavity, and the space between their organ systems is filled with parenchyma. Planarians lack a circulatory system, and absorb oxygen through their body wall. They uptake food to their gut using a muscular pharynx, and nutrients diffuse to internal tissues. A three-branched intestine runs across almost the entire body, and includes a single anterior and two posterior branches. The planarian intestine is a blind sac, having no exit cavity, and therefore planarians uptake food and egest waste through the same orifice, located near the middle of the ventral body surface.

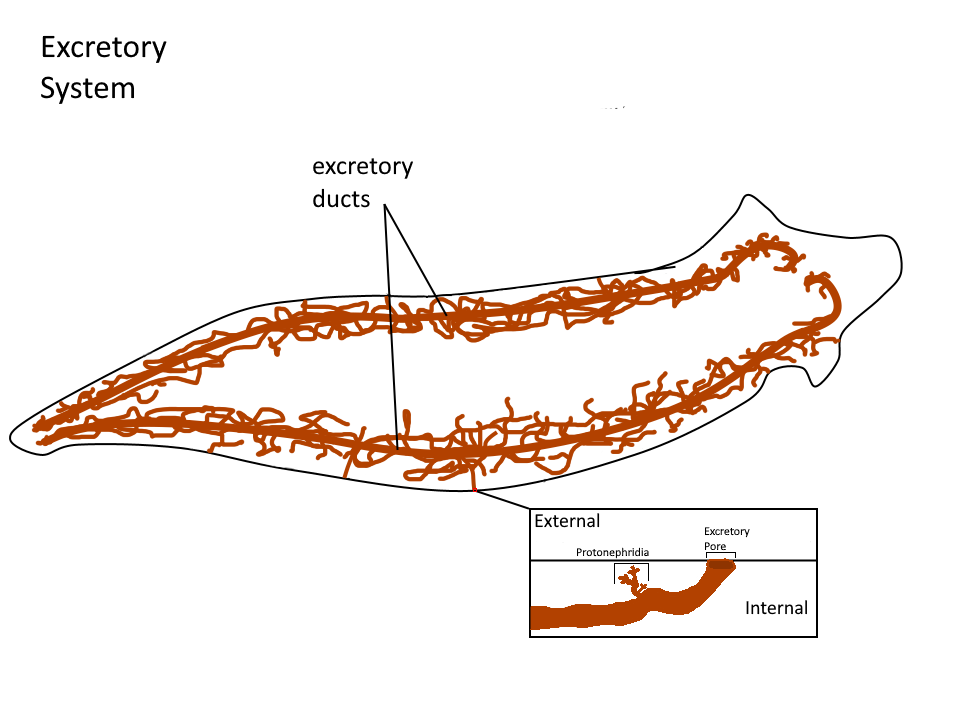
Planarian excretory system

The excretory system is made of many tubes with many flame cells and excretory pores on them. Also, flame cells remove unwanted liquids from the body by passing them through ducts which lead to excretory pores, where waste is released on the dorsal surface of the planarian.

The triclads have an anterior end or head where sense organs, such as eyes and chemoreceptors, are usually found. Some species have auricles that protrude from the margins of the head. The auricles can contain chemical and mechanical sensory receptors.

The number of eyes in the triclads is variable depending on the species. While many species have two eyes (e.g. Dugesia or Microplana), others have many more distributed along the body (e.g. most Geoplaninae). Sometimes, those species with two eyes may present smaller accessory or supernumerary eyes. The subterranean triclads are often eyeless or blind.

The body of the triclads is covered by a ciliated epidermis that contains rhabdites. Between the epidermis and the gastrodermis there is a parenchymatous tissue or mesenchyme.

=== Nervous system ===
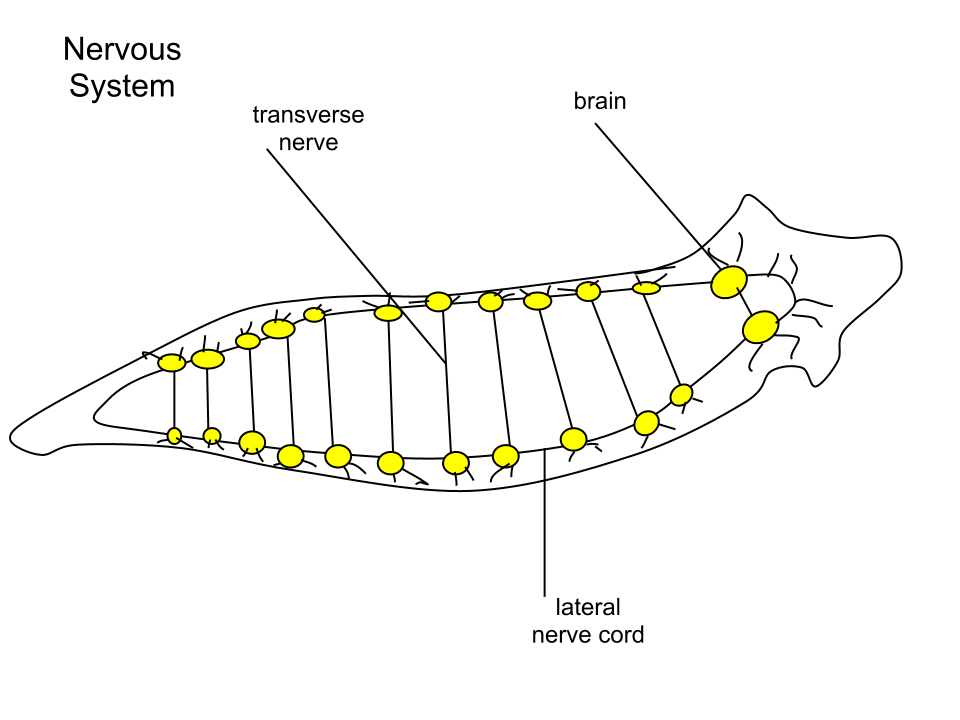
Planarian nervous system

The planarian nervous systems consists of a bilobed shaped cerebral ganglion that is referred to as the planarian brain. Longitudinal ventral nerve chords extend from the brain to the tail. Transverse nerves, commissure, connect the ventral nerve chords forming ladder-like nerve system. The brain has been shown to exhibit spontaneous electrophysiological oscillations, similar to the electroencephalographic (EEG) activity of other animals.

The Planarian has a soft, flat, wedge-shaped body that may be black, brown, blue, gray, or white. The blunt, triangular head has two ocelli (eyepots), pigmented areas that are sensitive to light. There are two auricles (earlike projections) at the base of the head, which are sensitive to touch and the presence of certain chemicals. The mouth is located in the middle of the underside of the body, which is covered with hairlike projections (cilia). There are no circulatory or respiratory systems; oxygen enters and carbon dioxide leaves the planarian's body by diffusing through the body wall.

=== Reproduction ===
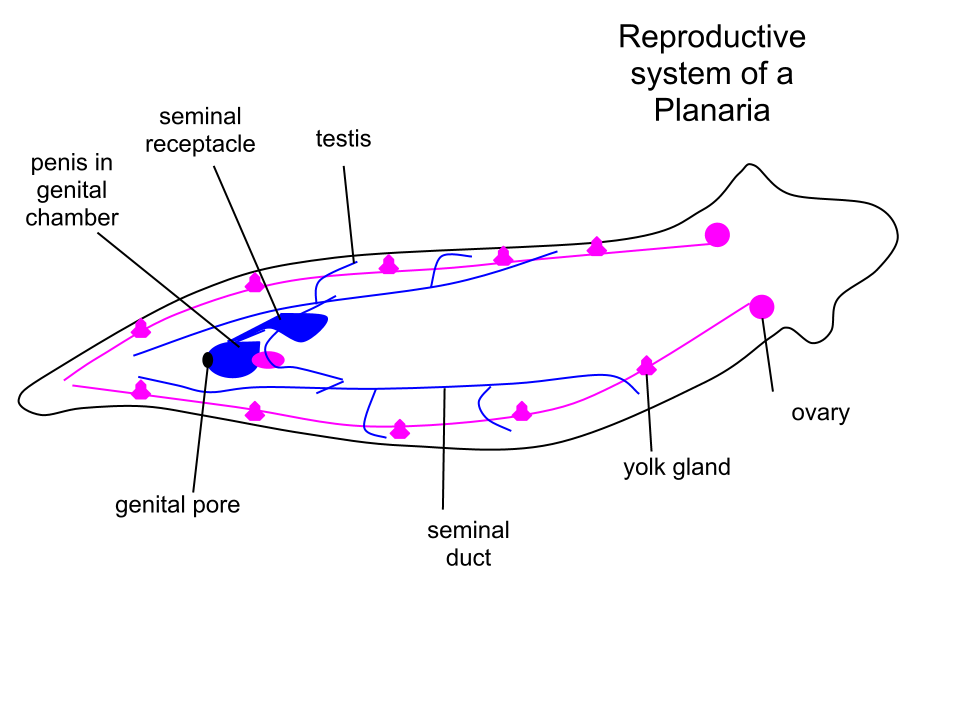
Planarian reproductive system

Triclads reproduce sexually and asexually, and different species may be able to reproduce by one or both modes. Planarians are hermaphrodites. In sexual reproduction, the mating generally involves mutual insemination.

Thus, one of their gametes will combine with the gamete of another planarian. Each planarian transports its secretion to the other planarian, giving and receiving sperm. Eggs develop inside the body and are shed in capsules. Weeks later, the eggs hatch and grow into adults. In asexual reproduction, the planarian fissions and each fragment regenerates its missing tissues, generating complete anatomy and restoring functions. Asexual reproduction, similar to regeneration following injury, requires neoblasts, adult stem cells, which proliferate and produce differentiated cells. Some researchers claim that the products derived from bisecting a planarian are similar to the products of planarian asexual reproduction; however, debates about the nature of asexual reproduction in planarians and its effect on the population are ongoing. Some species of planarian are exclusively asexual, whereas some can reproduce both sexually and asexually. In most of the cases the sexual reproduction involve two individuals; auto fecundation has been rarely reported (e.g. in Cura foremanii).

=== Neoblasts ===
Neoblasts are abundant adult stem cells that are found in the planarian parenchyma across the planarian body. They are small and round cells, 5 to 10 μm, and characterized by a large nucleus, which is surrounded by little cytoplasm. Neoblasts are required for regenerating missing tissues and organs, and they continuously replenish tissues by producing new cells. Neoblasts can self-renew and generate progenitors for different cell types. In contrast to adult vertebrate stem cells (e.g., hematopoietic stem cell), neoblasts are pluripotent (i.e., producing all somatic cell types). Moreover, they give rise to differentiating, post-mitotic, cells directly, and not by producing rapidly-dividing transit amplifying cells. Consequently, neoblasts divide frequently, and apparently lack a large sub-population of dormant or slow-cycling cells.

== As a model system in biological and biomedical research ==
The life history of planarians make them a model system for investigating a number of biological processes, many of which may have implications for human health and disease. Advances in molecular genetic technologies has made the study of gene function possible in these animals and scientists are studying them worldwide. Like other invertebrate model organisms, for example C. elegans and D. melanogaster, the relative simplicity of planarians facilitates experimental study.

Planarians have a number of cell types, tissues and simple organs that are homologous to human cells, tissues and organs. However, regeneration has attracted the most attention. Thomas Hunt Morgan was responsible for some of the first systematic studies (that still underpin modern research) before the advent of molecular biology as a discipline.

Planarians are also an emerging model organism for aging research. These animals have an apparently limitless regenerative capacity, and asexual Schmidtea mediterranea has been shown to maintain its telomere length through regeneration.

Live planarians are increasingly used in toxicological research due to their regenerative capabilities, simple anatomy, and sensitivity to environmental changes. Their ability to regenerate lost body parts provides a unique model to study the effects of chemical exposures on cellular processes, while their rapid response to toxins makes them an efficient tool for screening potential environmental and pharmaceutical hazards. An example of this application is a fluorescence-based skin irritability assay, where planarians are exposed to various chemicals, and fluorescence dye is used to evaluate their epithelial damage in response to irritation, providing an effective screening method.

== Regeneration ==
Planarian regeneration combines new tissue production with reorganization to the existing anatomy through the process of morphallaxis. The rate of tissue regrowth varies between species, but in frequently used lab species, functional regenerated tissues are available already 7–10 days following tissue amputation. Regeneration starts following an injury that require the growth of a new tissue. Neoblasts localized near the injury site proliferate to generate a structure of differentiating cells called blastema. Neoblasts are required for new cell production, and they therefore provide the cellular basis for planarian regeneration. Cell signaling mechanisms provide positional information that regulates the cell types and tissues that are produced from the neoblasts in regeneration. Many signaling molecules that provide positional information to neoblasts, in regeneration and homeostasis, are expressed in muscle cells. Following injury, muscle cells throughout the body can alter the expression of genes that encode molecules that provide positional information. Therefore, the activities of neoblasts and muscle cells following injuries are essential for successful regeneration.

Historically, planarians have been considered "immortal under the edge of a knife." Very small pieces of the planarian, estimated to be as little as 1/279th of the organism it is cut from, can regenerate back into a complete organism over the course of a few weeks. New tissues can grow due to pluripotent stem cells that have the ability to create all the various cell types. These adult stem cells are called neoblasts, and comprise 20% or more of the cells in the adult animal. They are the only proliferating cells in the worm, and they differentiate into progeny that replace older cells. In addition, existing tissue is remodeled to restore symmetry and proportion of the new planarians that forms from a piece of a cut up organism.

The organism itself does not have to be completely cut into separate pieces for the regeneration phenomenon to be witnessed. In fact, if the head of a planarian is cut in half down its center, and each side retained on the organism, it is possible for the planarian to regenerate two heads and continue to live.

Researchers, including those from Tufts University in the U.S., sought to determine how microgravity and micro-geomagnetic fields would affect the growth and regeneration of planarian flatworms, Dugesia japonica. They discovered that one of the amputated fragments sent to space regenerated into a double-headed worm. The majority of such amputated worms (95%) did not do so, however. An amputated worm regenerated into a double-head worm after spending five weeks aboard the International Space Station (ISS) – though regeneration of amputated worms as double-headed heteromorphosis is not a rare phenomenon unique to a microgravity environment. Double-headed planarian regenerates can be induced by exposing amputated fragments to electrical fields. Electrical field exposure with opposite polarity can induce a planarian with two tails. Double-headed planarian regenerates can also be induced by treating amputated fragments with pharmacological agents that alter levels of calcium, cyclic AMP, and protein kinase C activity in cells, as well as by genetic expression blocks (interference RNA) to the canonical Wnt/β-Catenin signalling pathway.

== Biochemical memory experiments ==
In 1955, Robert Thompson and James V. McConnell conditioned planarian flatworms by pairing a bright light with an electric shock. After repeating this several times they took away the electric shock, and only exposed them to the bright light. The flatworms would react to the bright light as if they had been shocked. Thompson and McConnell found that if they cut the worm in two, and allowed both worms to regenerate, each half would develop the light-shock reaction. In 1963, McConnell repeated the experiment, but instead of cutting the trained flatworms in two he ground them into small pieces and fed them to other flatworms. He reported that the flatworms learned to associate the bright light with a shock much faster than flatworms who had not been fed trained worms.

This experiment intended to test whether memory could be transferred chemically. The experiment was repeated with mice, fish, and rats, but it always failed to produce the same results. The perceived explanation was that rather than memory being transferred to the other animals, it was the hormones in the ingested ground animals that changed the behavior. McConnell believed that this was evidence of a chemical basis for memory, which he identified as memory RNA. McConnell's results are now attributed to observer bias. No blinded experiment has ever reproduced his results of planarians scrunching when exposed to light. Subsequent explanations of this scrunching behaviour associated with cannibalism of trained planarian worms were that the untrained flatworms were only following tracks left on the dirty glassware rather than absorbing the memory of their fodder.

In 2012, Tal Shomrat and Michael Levin have shown that planarians exhibit evidence of long-term memory retrieval after regenerating a new head.

== Planarian species used for research and education ==
Several planarian species are commonly used for biological research. Popular experimental species are Schmidtea mediterranea, Schmidtea polychroa, and Dugesia japonica, which in addition to excellent regenerative abilities, are easy to culture in the lab. In recent decades, S. mediterranea has emerged as the species of choice for modern molecular biology research, due to its diploid chromosomes and the availability of both asexual and sexual strains.

The most frequently used planarian in high school and first-year college laboratories is the brownish Girardia tigrina. Other common species used are the blackish Planaria maculata and Girardia dorotocephala.

== See also ==
- Worm Runner's Digest – Satirical (and serious) science journal (1959–1979)
