= Purkyně =

Purkyně may refer to:

- 3701 Purkyně, main belt asteroid with an orbital period of 1709
- Jan Evangelista Purkyně (1787–1869), Czech anatomist and physiologist
- Karel Purkyně (1834–1868), Czech painter
- Purkyně (crater), lunar impact crater on the far side from the Earth
- Purkyne fibers in the inner ventricular walls of the heart

== See also ==
- Jan Evangelista Purkyně University in Ústí nad Labem (UJEP) in the Czech Republic
