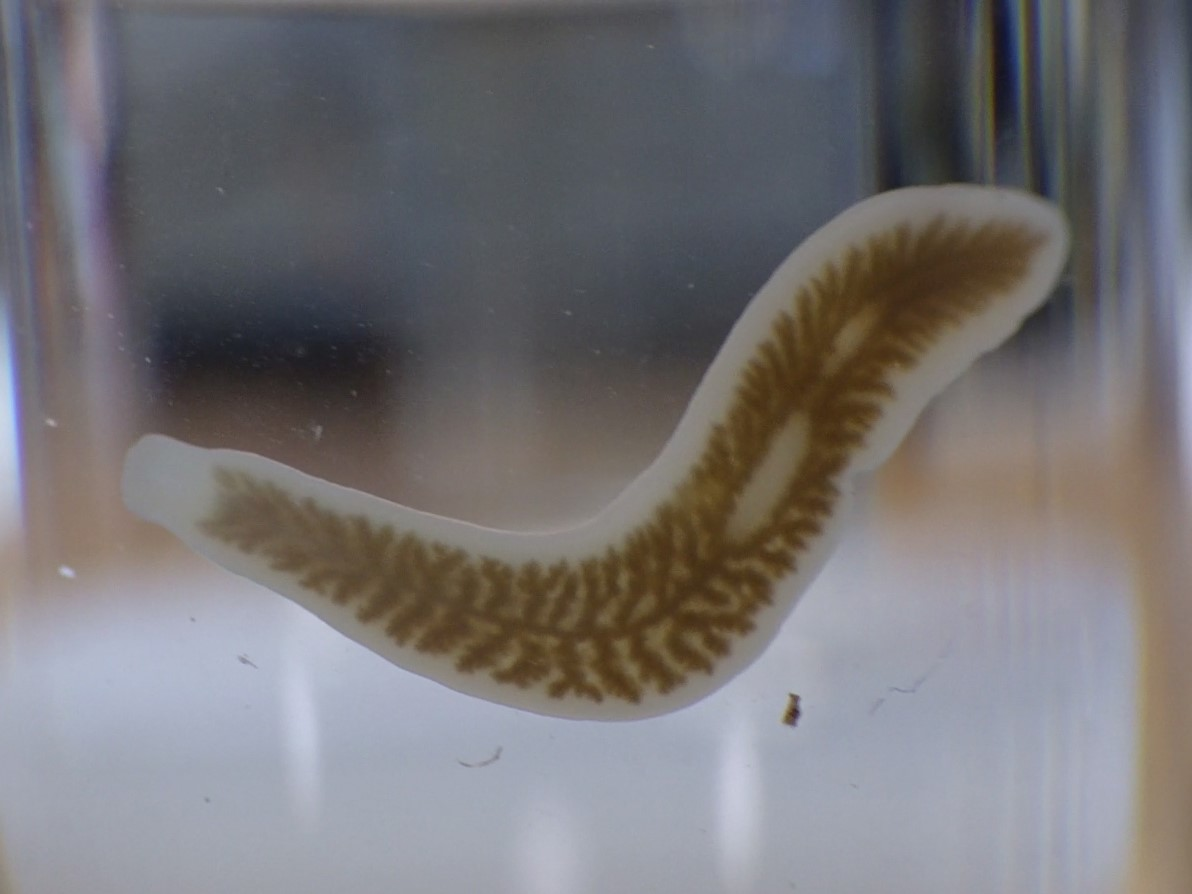

Scientific classification
- Kingdom: Animalia
- Phylum: Platyhelminthes
- Order: Tricladida
- Family: Dendrocoelidae
- Genus: Procotyla; Leidy, 1857

Species
- P. armata Korotnev, 1912; P. armatus Korotnev, 1912; P. fluviatilis Leidy, 1857; P. leidyi Girard, 1893; P. typhlops Kenk, 1935

= Procotyla =

Genus of flatworms

Procotyla is a genus of freshwater planarian. Species of the genus Procotyla are known from North America and Russia.

== Conservation ==
Procotyla typhlops is an endangered species in Maryland.

== Species ==
The genus Procotyla includes the following species:

- Procotyla armata Korotnev, 1912
- Procotyla armatus Korotnev, 1912
- Procotyla fluviatilis Leidy, 1857
- Procotyla leidyi Girard, 1893
- Procotyla typhlops Kenk, 1935

Species formerly included in this genus include:

- Procotyla baicalensis Sabussow, 1903 – now accepted as Bdellocephala baikalensis (Sabussow, 1903)
- Procotyla magnus Korotnev, 1912 – now accepted as Protocotylus magnus (Korotnev, 1912)
