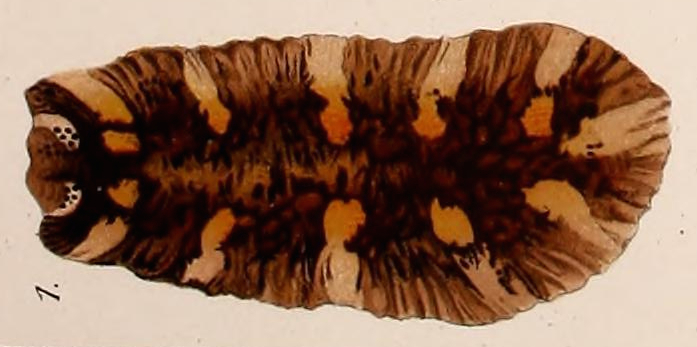

Scientific classification
- Domain: Eukaryota
- Kingdom: Animalia
- Phylum: Platyhelminthes
- Order: Tricladida
- Family: Dendrocoelidae
- Genus: Baikalobia
- Species: B. variegata

Binomial name
- Baikalobia variegata (Korotnev, 1912)

= Baikalobia variegata =

Species of planarian

Baikalobia variegata is a species of freshwater triclad in the family Dendrocoelidae. It has been found in Lake Baikal.
