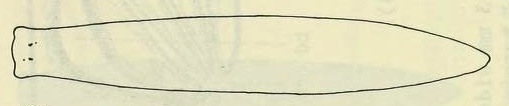

Scientific classification
- Kingdom: Animalia
- Phylum: Platyhelminthes
- Order: Tricladida
- Family: Dendrocoelidae
- Genus: Dendrocoelopsis
- Species: D. alaskensis

Binomial name
- Dendrocoelopsis alaskensis Kenk, 1953

= Dendrocoelopsis alaskensis =

Species of worm

Dendrocoelopsis alaskensis is a species of freshwater triclad in the family Dendrocoelidae. It is found in the White Mountains in Alaska.

== Etymology ==
Though not explicitly stated in the original publication, the specific epithet is clearly derived from its type-locality, being found in the streams of Alaska's White Mountains.

== Description ==
Dendrocoelopsis alaskensis has two auricles on its front. The head slightly narrows behind those auricles; the body widens in the middle and the back is a blunt point. Its body is all white. It has two eyes.
