= Hermann Fol =

Swiss zoologist (1845–1892)

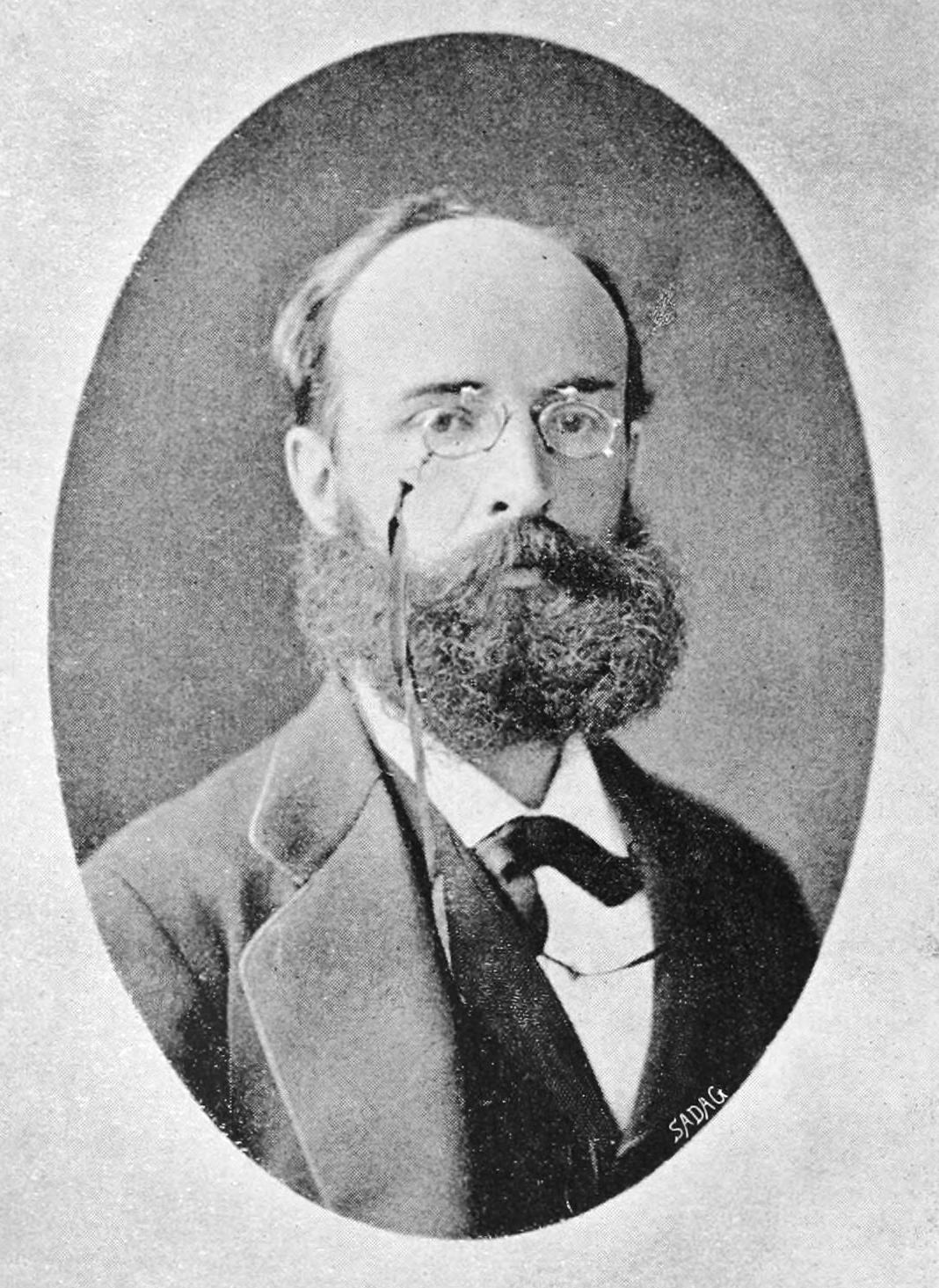
- Born: July 23, 1845; Saint-Mandé, Val-de-Marne, France
- Died: March 17, 1892 (aged 46); At sea, off the coast of west Africa
- Citizenship: Swiss
- Education: University of Jena
- Known for: cytology

Hermann Fol (23 July 1845, Saint-Mandé – March 1892) was a Swiss zoologist and has been considered a pioneer of embryology. He studied under Édouard Claparède and Ernst Haeckel and took a special interest in the fertilization and embryology of echinoderms. He also innovated scientific devices, examined the safety of drinking water and was interested in rabies vaccinations. He was involved in establishing a marine biology laboratory at Villefranche-sur-Me and vanished at sea aboard a small yacht, the Aster, which left on 13 March from Le Havre and he was last known living on 17th March. The boat was later discovered off the coast of west Africa with nobody aboard.

== Life and work ==
Fol was born in a wealthy banking family in Geneva then living at St. Mandé, near Paris where his father Etienne-Joseph worked. His mother died when he was six years old and he went to secondary school in Geneva where he was influenced by Edouard Claparède and François Jules Pictet de la Rive (1809–1872). He then went to study medicine in University of Jena and Berlin where he was a student of Johannes Müller and Ernst Haeckel. He was chosen by Haeckel to join an expedition to the canary Islands in 1866 along with Nikolai Miklucho and Richard Greeff. Haeckel found Fol arrogant and returned to Europe leaving the students. On his return to Europe he undertook medical studies in Heidelberg and completed them by obtaining his diploma in 1869 in Zurich and Berlin. He passed his exams in 1869 with a thesis on the evolutionary history of ctenophores which was dedicated to Carl Gegenbauer. In 1871 he studied planktonic fauna in Villefranche-sur-Mer on the recommendation of Carl Vogt (1817–1895). In 1876, he observed the penetration of a spermatozoon into an egg becoming thus a pioneer of the microscopic studies of fertilisation and cellular division. Oscar Hertwig also observed this in the same year.

Coming from a wealthy family he did not practice medicine and instead established a personal laboratory in Messina where he studied radiolarians. He married Emma-Barthélémine Bourrit (1846–1914) in 1873 and they had a daughter Alice who became a mollusc specialist. Fol published widely and was offered a position at Naples but he rejected it. In 1878, Fol obtained a post of professor at the University of Geneva. In 1886, he resigned from his post in Geneva to devote himself entirely to his research in Villefranche-sur-Mer where, in 1880, he had established a small marine laboratory with Jules Henri Barrois (1852–1943). Barrois was at the University of Lille and the station was under the École Pratique des Hautes Études in Paris. In 1884 he founded the journal Recueil Zoologique Suisse. In 1886 he was resigned from his position but continued his research at the Villefranche research station where he held the position of adjoint director. It is believed that Aleksei Korotnev of the University of Kiev was interested in getting the research station into a Franco-Russian collaboration with Barrois. They used the Maison Russe where the relationship between Korotnev, Fol and Barrois broke down leading to Fol and Barrois being evicted. Fol then planned to start a new research station in Nice. Funded partly by the French government to carry out a study of distribution of sponges on the Tunisian and Greek coasts, Fol departed Le Havre on his new yacht, l' Aster, on March 13, 1892, accompanied by several team members. After a stopover in Bénodet, the yacht disappeared at sea, and Fol was never seen again. The boat was last seen at Bénodet where a crew member met a lighthouse keeper. His wife received a letter dated March 17 posted from Brest. Subsequently there were some claimed contacts but it was not until four months later that his wife and brother-in-law raised an alarm. In June 1892 there were press reports of doubtful veracity with theories on the disappearance of the crew.

== Barthometer ==
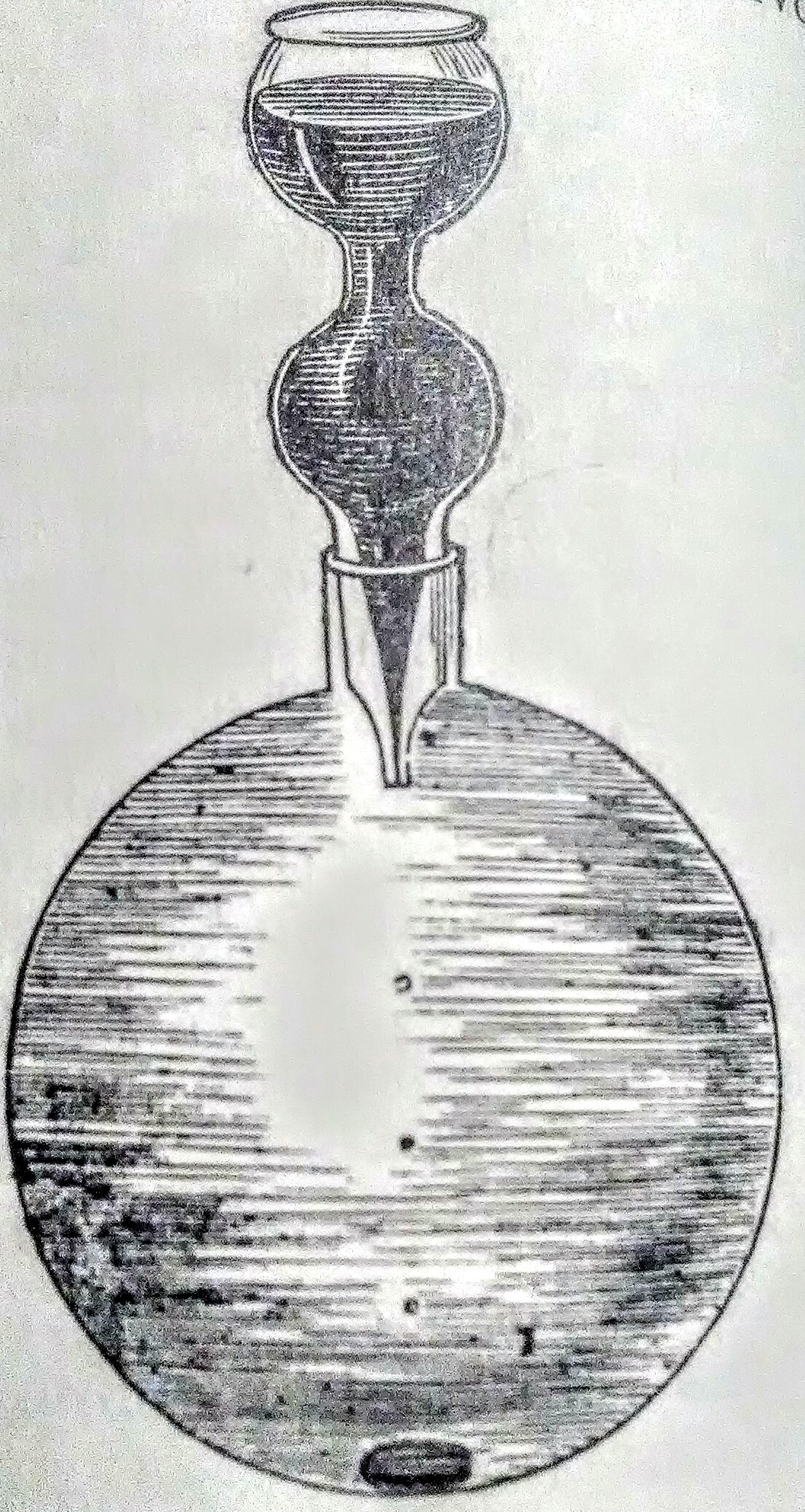
A New Barthometer by Hermann Fol

Fol is credited with the invention of the barthometer. The barometer properly measured mercury, the pressure to which the apparatus had been submitted, and the determination of the depth of compressible liquid within the device. His invention consisted of a spherical glass reservoir of a liquid that is slightly compressible, such as water or ether. The single hole to the vessel is a capillary tube that corresponds with a minor reservoir filled with mercury. Mercury, along the assumed temperature of the water at the sea bottom, must remain at the stage with the hole in the pointed stopper within the large reservoir. The top surface of the mercury is released to contact the water. The device is lowered by the sound line. The water or ether will compress as the device lowers, a given amount of each atmosphere of pressure, and a correlating amount of mercury will release between the hole and lower to the base of the bottom reservoir.

== Works ==
- Études sur les Appendiculaires du Détroit de Messine; Genf, Ramboz et Schuchardt, 1872.
- Die erste Entwickelung des Geryonideneies; Jena Zeitschr. 7. 471–492. pl. 24, 25. 1873
- Études sur le développement des mollusques. Premier mémoire : Sur le développement des ptéropodes; Paris, France : Centre National de la recherche scientifique, 1875?
- Note sur l'origine première des produits sexuels; Paris, Arch. sci. phys. nat. 1875. 53. 104-111
- Études sur le développement des mollusques. [Premier mémoire. Sur le développement des ptéropodes]; Paris, C. Reinwald, 1875
- Études sur le développement des mollusques. 1–3, 1875–1880; Archives de zool. exper. 4. 1875. 1–214. pl. 1–10; 5. 1876. 1-54. pl. 1–4; 8. 1880. 103–232. pl. 9-18
- Ueber die Schleimdrüse oder den Endostyl der Tunicaten; Morphol. Jahrb. 1876. 1. 222–242. pl. 7.
- Ein neues Compressorium; Morphol. Jahrbuch. 2. 1876. 440-444
- Sopra i fenomeni intimi della fecondazione degli echinodermi; Transunti R. Accad. Lincei, Rom, 1. 1877. 181-183
- Sur quelques fécondations anormales chez l'étoile de mer; Compter rendus Acad. sci. Paris. 84. 1877. 659-661
- Sur les phénomènes intimes de la division cellulaire; Paris, Comp. rend. Acad. sci Paris. 1876. 83. 667-669
- Sur les phénomènes intimes de la fécondation; Comptes rendus Acad. sci. Paris. 84. 268–271. 1877
- Sur le premier développement d'une étoile de mer [Asterias glacialis]; Comptes rendus Acad. sci. Paris. 84. 1877. 357-360
- Sur les premiers phénomènes de développement des echinodermes. Asterias glacialis; Rev. scient. de la France et de l'étranger. (2), xiii, 300. 1877
- Recherches sur la fécondation et le commencement de l'hénogénie chez divers animaux; Genf, 1879
- Contribution à la connaissance de la famille Tintinnodea; Genf, Bureau des archives, 1881
- Sur le Sticholonche Zanclea et un nouvel ordre de Rhizopodes; Genf, Georg, 1882
- Sur la production artificielle de l'inversion viscérale, ou heterotaxie chez des embryons de poulet; Comptes rendus Acad. sci. Paris. 1883 (mit Édouard Sarasin)
- Sur l'anatomie d'un embryon humain de la quatrième semaine; Comptes-rendus Acad. sci. Paris. 97. 1883. 1563-1566
- Sur l'origine de l'individualité chez les animaux supérieurs; Comptes-rendus Acad. sci. Paris. 97. 1883. 497-499
- Sur l'origine des cellules du follicule et de l'ovule chez les ascidies et chez d'autres animaux; Comptes rendus Acad. sci. Paris. 96. 1883. 1591-1594
- Sur la profondeur à laquelle la lumière du jour penètre dans les eaux de la mer; Paris, 1884*Sur la pénétration de la lumière du jour dans les eaux du lac de Genève; Paris, 1884 (with Sarasin)
- Sur un appareil photographique destiné à prendre des poses d'animaux en mouvement; Archives des sciences physiques et naturelles ([de la] Bibliothèque Universelle) Troisième période, t(ome) 11. 11. (No. 5.15) Mai 1884
- Nouvelle méthode pour le transvasage de bouillons stérilisés et le dosage des germes vivants contenus dans l'eau; Genf, 1884 Recueil zoologique Suisse; Genf, Georg, 1884
- Sur l'effet d'un repos prolongé et sur celui d'un filtrage par la porcelaine sur la pureté de l'eau; Genf, 1885 (mit Pierre Louis Dunant)
- Les microbes : résumé de deux conférences données à l'aula de l'Université de Genève en janvier 1885; Genf, Georg, 1885 Les microbes; Genf, Georg, 1885
- Sur la queue de l'embryon humain; Paris, 1885
- Deux laboratoires zoologiques sur le littoral méditerranéen de la France; Genf, 1884
- Beiträge zur histologischen Technik; : Zeitschrift f. Wissensch. Zoologie. 38. 1884. 491-495
- Recherches sur le nombre des germes vivants que renferment quelques eaux de Genève et des environs; Mémoires de la Société de physique et d'histoire naturelle de Genève, Tome 29, No. 3. Genève 1884 (with Pierre-Louis Dunant)
- Zoologie générale : Leçons données à l'Université de Genève pendant le semester d'hiver 1882-83; Genf, H. Georg, 1884
- Les Microbes : Résumé de deux Conférences données à l'Autor l'Université de Genève en Janvier 1885 (avec 5 Planches hors texte); Genf, 1885 Genève et son université; Genf, Imprimerie Charles Schuchardt, 1886
- Zoologie et physiologie; Arch. des sci. phys. et nat. (3). 16. 327-October 1886
- Sur la pénétration de la lumière dans la profondeur de la mer à diverses heures du jour; Paris, 1886 (Édouard Sarasin)
- Lehrbuch der vergleichenden mikroskopischen Anatomie Lfg.1. Die mikroskopisch-anatomische Technik; Leipzig Engelmann 1884
- Lehrbuch der vergleichenden mikroskopischen Anatomie, mit Einschluss der vergleichenden Histologie und Histogenie; Leipzig, Wilhelm Engelmann, 1884
- [Letter of resignation]; Genf, 1886
- Pénétration de la lumière du jour dans les eaux du lac de Genève et dans celles de la Méditerranée; Mémoires de la Société de physique et d'histoire naturelle de Genève, Tome 29, No. 13. Genève 1887
- Réponse à quelques objections formulées contre mes idées sur la pénétration du zoosperme; Paris, 1887
- Sur le commencement de l'hénogénie chez divers animaux; Arch. sci. phys. et naturelles. Geneve. 58. 439–472. 1877
- Le quadrille des centres : un épisode nouveau dans l'histoire de la fécondation : (extrait); Genf, Impr. Aubert-Schuchardt, 1891
- La lumière dans l'interieur de la mer; Neptunia. 1. 277–279; 1891
- Lehrbuch der vergleichenden mikroskopischen Anatomie Lfg.2. Die Zelle; Leipzig Engelmann 1896
- Recherches sur la fécondation et le commencement de l'hénogénie chez divers animaux; Genf, 1897
- Die Zelle; Leipzig, Engelmann, 1896

== See also ==
- List of people who disappeared
