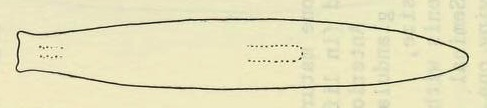

Conservation status
- Vulnerable (NatureServe)

Scientific classification
- Kingdom: Animalia
- Phylum: Platyhelminthes
- Order: Tricladida
- Family: Dendrocoelidae
- Genus: Dendrocoelopsis
- Species: D. americana

Binomial name
- Dendrocoelopsis americana (Hyman, 1939)

Synonyms
- Sorocelis americana Hyman, 1939

= Dendrocoelopsis americana =

Species of flatworm

Dendrocoelopsis americana is a species of triclad belonging to the family Dendrocoelidae. It has been found in the South Central United States.

== Description ==
Dendrocoelopsis americana can reach up to eighteen millimeters long and around 1.5–2 millimeters wide. It has several eyes, arranged in two arclike bands on each side of its head. These bands have been recorded to have, individually, as few as eight eyes or as many as twenty. Its head is truncate. Its mouth and pharynx are in the middle of the body; the genital pore is located slightly below the mouth and pharynx. It is unpigmented, seen as a white or creamy color.

== Taxonomy ==
Dendrocoelopsis americana was first described in 1939 by Libbie Hyman, placed in the genus Sorocelis as Sorocelis americana. Though not explicitly stated in the original publication by Hyman, the specific epithet is almost certainly referring to its type locality of the Americas; Hyman remarked that the species was the first of the genus Sorocelis to be found on the American continents. It was later placed into the genus Dendrocoelopsis by Roman Kenk.

== Distribution and habitat ==
The species has been found in various parts of the Ozark Plateau, within the states of Oklahoma, Arkansas, and Missouri, as well as in other parts of the southern United States such as Texas. It has been found near-exclusively in aquatic sites within caves.
