= Bdellocephala melanocinerea =

Scientific classification
- Domain: Eukaryota
- Kingdom: Animalia
- Phylum: Platyhelminthes
- Order: Tricladida
- Family: Dendrocoelidae
- Genus: Bdellocephala
- Species: B. melanocinerea

Binomial name
- Bdellocephala melanocinerea (Korotneff, 1912)

Synonyms
- Sorocelis melanocinerea Korotneff, 1912

Species of worm

Bdellocephala melanocinerea is a species of freshwater triclad in the family Dendrocoelidae.

== Description ==
Bdellocephala melanocinerea is flat, with wavy margins. It's around 48 mm long and has two eyes.
