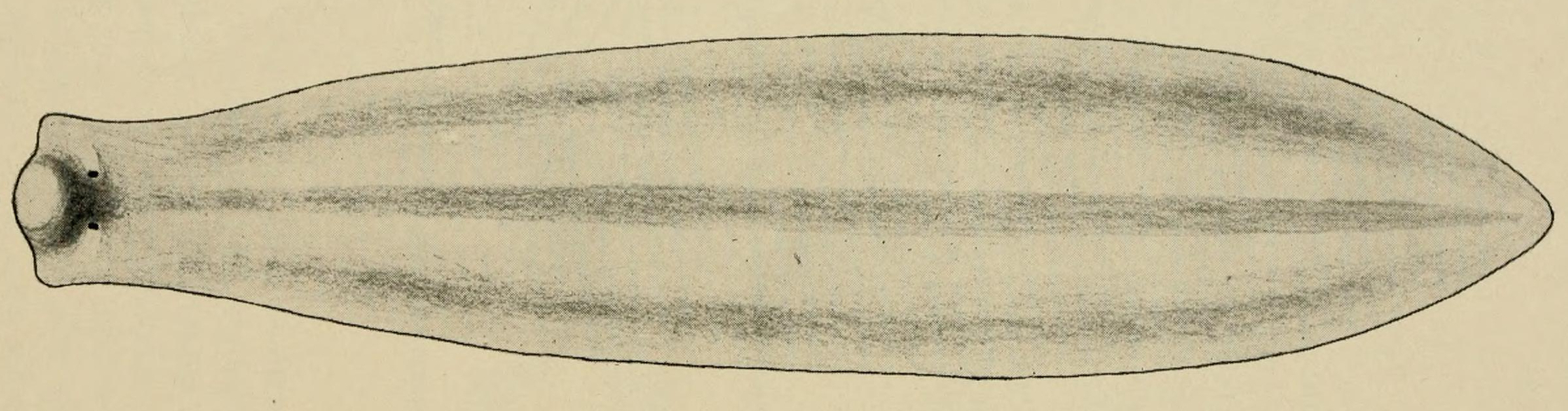

Scientific classification
- Kingdom: Animalia
- Phylum: Platyhelminthes
- Order: Tricladida
- Family: Dendrocoelidae
- Genus: Dendrocoelopsis
- Species: D. piriformis

Binomial name
- Dendrocoelopsis piriformis Kenk, 1953

= Dendrocoelopsis piriformis =

Species of worm

Dendrocoelopsis piriformis is a species of freshwater triclad in the family Dendrocoelidae. It is found in Alaska.

== Etymology ==
Though not explicitly stated in the original publication, the specific epithet is from the New Latin piriformis, meaning "pear-shaped", deriving from the shape of the species' body, which Roman Kenk explicitly describes as "pear-shaped" in his original description.

== Description ==
Dendrocoelopsis piriformis is about fifteen millimeters long and three millimeters wide. It has a truncated head with two small auricles, the protruding of which creates the appearance of a neck. Its mouth is in the middle of its body; at the mouth level, the body is widest. The back of the body is a blunt point. It has two eyes. Its body has been described as a "cloudy brown or dark brownish gray" in color. Members of the species occasionally have stripes that are vertical down the length of the body; these specimens have one sharp middle stripe, flanked on either side by a light yellow band. Between the species' eyes, there is a dark field of pigment that extends to both sides of the worm's grasping organ. Above the organ, the area is white, as are the areas anterolateral to the eyes. Its underside is a light grey color.
