= Dendrocoelum italicum =

Scientific classification
- Kingdom: Animalia
- Phylum: Platyhelminthes
- Order: Tricladida
- Family: Dendrocoelidae
- Genus: Dendrocoelum
- Species: D. italicum

Binomial name
- Dendrocoelum italicum Vialli, 1937

Synonyms
- Dendrocoelides italicum (Vialli, 1937)

Species of worm

Dendrocoelum italicum is a cave-adapted freshwater planarian which is endemic to Bus del Budrio cave in the Italian Prealps.

== Discovery ==
This planarian species was discovered by the Italian entomologist Mario Pavan on 18 October 1936 in a subterranean pool below a waterfall in Bus del Budrio cave in northern Italy. The specimens were sent to the Italian biologist Maffo Vialli, who described the species, naming it Dendrocoelum italicum.

== Human impact and habitat restoration ==
During the 1980s, a pipe was installed in the cave, diverting the water that originated the waterfall to a nearby farm. As a consequence, the pool inhabited by D. italicum dried up permanently. The species survived in a very reduced environment formed by a small rivulet and some ponds created by water dripping from the roof of the cave. This critical situation was discovered in 2016 and led to a restoration program to save the species.

On 3 December 2016, all planarians were removed from the rivulet and stored in plastic tanks inside the cave. Afterward, the pipe and its associated structure were removed from the cave, allowing the water to follow its natural curse and restoring the pool. On the next day, the planarians were released in the pool. The ecosystem was monitored until January 2018, when it was concluded that the restoration was successful and the population of D. italicum was stable.
