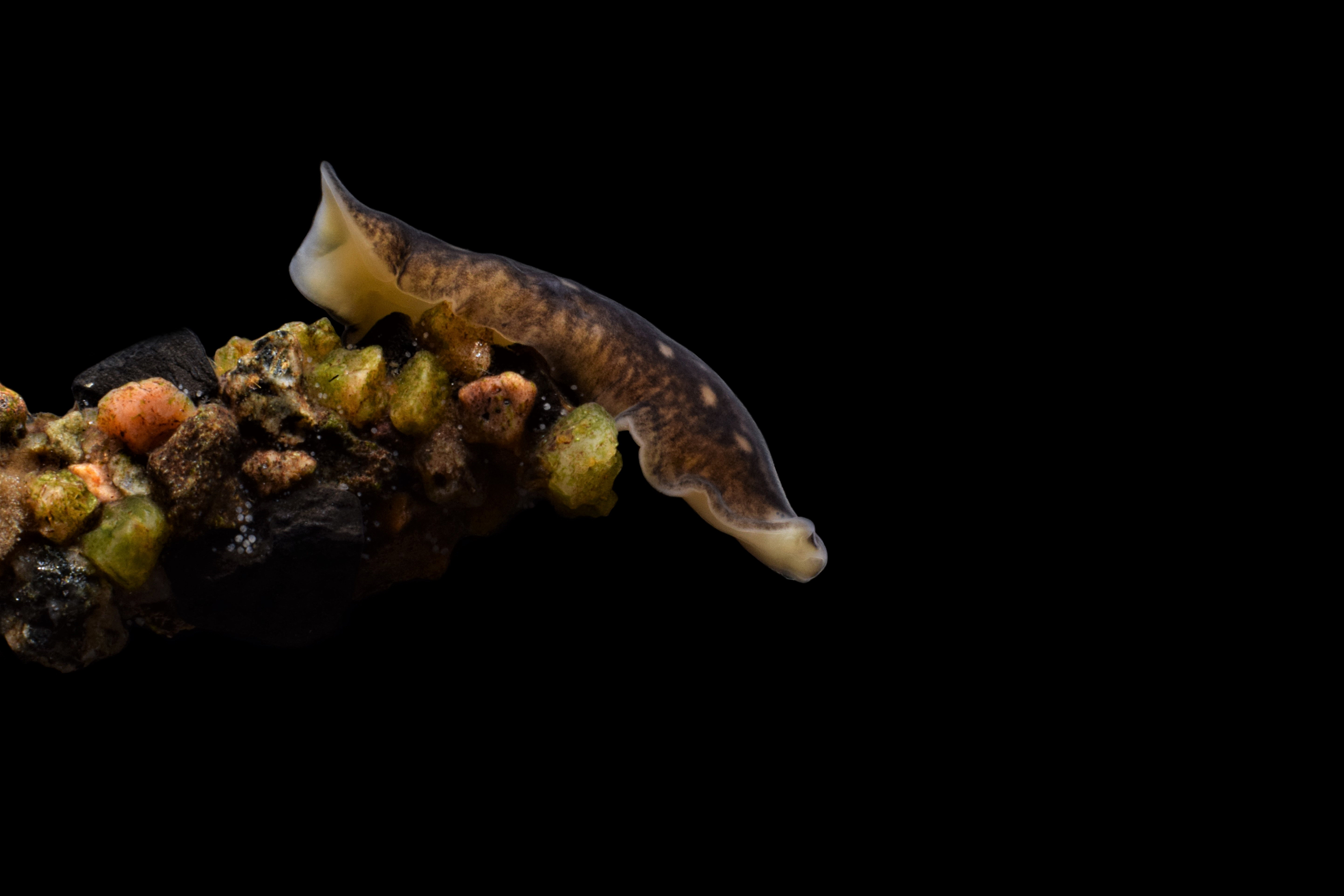
- B. guttata with a caddisfly

Scientific classification
- Domain: Eukaryota
- Kingdom: Animalia
- Phylum: Platyhelminthes
- Order: Tricladida
- Family: Dendrocoelidae
- Genus: Baikalobia
- Species: B. guttata

Binomial name
- Baikalobia guttata (Gerstfeldt, 1858)

= Baikalobia guttata =

Species of planarian

Baikalobia guttata is a species of freshwater triclad in the family Dendrocoelidae. It has been found in Lake Baikal.
