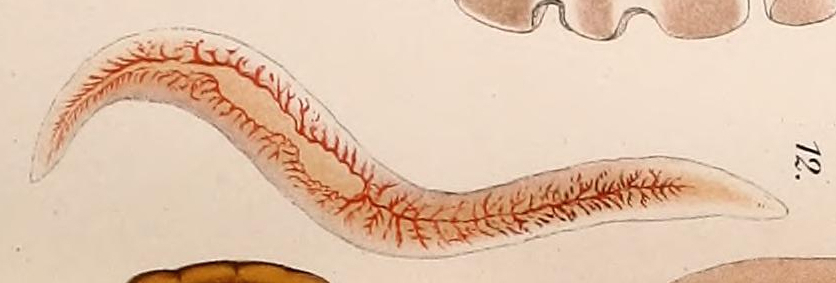
- Archicotylus elongatus

Scientific classification
- Domain: Eukaryota
- Kingdom: Animalia
- Phylum: Platyhelminthes
- Order: Tricladida
- Family: Dendrocoelidae
- Genus: Archicotylus; Korotneff, 1912

Species
- See text

= Archicotylus =

Genus of planarian

Archicotylus is a genus of freshwater triclads belonging to the family Dendrocoelidae. It has largely been found in Russia in Lake Baikal.

== Species ==
According to the World Register of Marine Species, Archicotylus contains the following species:

- Archicotylus cinereus Korotneff, 1912
- Archicotylus decoloratus Korotneff, 1912
- Archicotylus elongatus Korotneff, 1912
- Archicotylus junca (Korotnev, 1912)
- Archicotylus parvipunctatus (Korotnev, 1912)
- Archicotylus planus (Sabussow, 1903)
- Archicotylus rubzowi Porfirieva, 1977
- Archicotylus viviparus Rubtzoff, 1928
