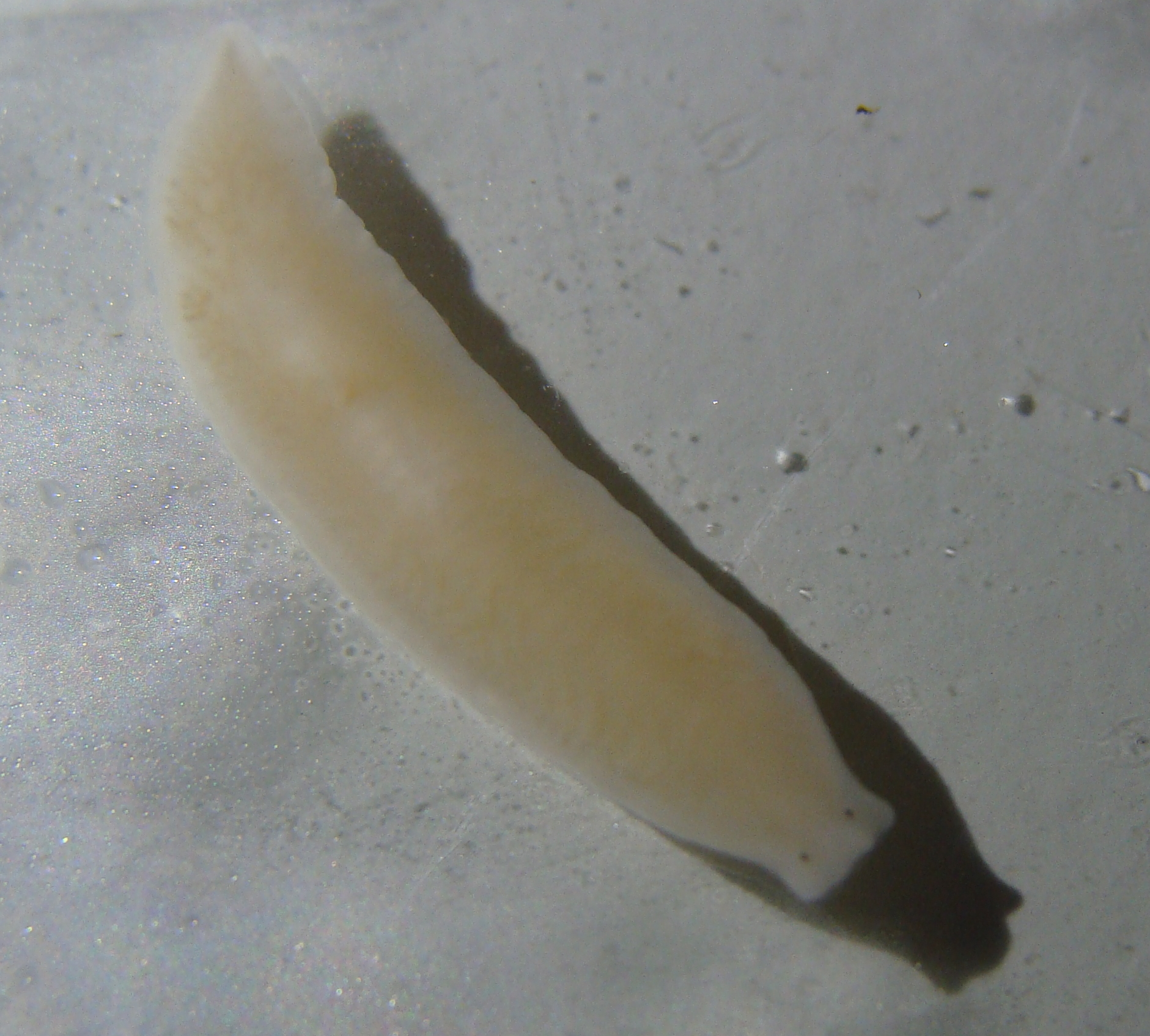

Scientific classification
- Kingdom: Animalia
- Phylum: Platyhelminthes
- Order: Tricladida
- Family: Dendrocoelidae
- Genus: Dendrocoelum
- Species: D. lacteum

Binomial name
- Dendrocoelum lacteum (O. F. Müller, 1774)

Synonyms
- Eudendrocoelum lacteum (Müller OF, 1773)

= Dendrocoelum lacteum =

Species of flatworm

Dendrocoelum lacteum, the milk-white planarian, is a freshwater planarian found in lakes and running waters in Europe, being the most widespread freshwater planarian in this continent.

== Description ==
Mature specimens of D. lacteum measure between 12 and 25 mm in length and up to 6 mm in width. The body is completely white, although the presence of food in the intestine may give it a temporary different color. The head is narrower than the rest of the body and has a blunt end. There are two short blunt projections laterally to the anterior end that form tentacles. There is also a ventral subterminal sucker that is more evident during locomotion. The eyes are seen as two dorsal black dots wide apart right in front of the constriction that separates the head from the body. The body margins often have a frilled appearance.

== Distribution and ecology ==
Dendrocoelum lacteum is widely distributed across Europe in all sorts of freshwater bodies. It is usually found under submerged rocks or dead leaves on the margin of the water bodies.

The diet of D. lacteum consists of smaller invertebrates found in the same habitat. The main component of its diet seems to be freshwater isopods of the genus Asellus and their presence in a water body appear to be essential for the occurrence of the planarian. Other ingested invertebrates include amphipods of the genus Gammarus and, less frequently, freshwater oligochaetes. Differently from freshwater planarians of the families Planariidae and Dugesiidae, D. lacteum does not feed on freshwater snails, which allows it to coexist with other planarian species without much food competition.
