= Observatoire Oceanologique de Villefranche =

Sorbonne University campus, Southern France

Coordinates: 43°41′47″N 7°18′24″E

The Observatoire Oceanologique de Villefranche (Villefranche-sur-Mer Marine Station) is a satellite campus of Sorbonne University (Sorbonne Faculty of Science and Engineering) in Villefranche-sur-Mer on the Côte d'Azur, France. It houses two research/teaching laboratories co-administered by Sorbonne University and the CNRS. The two laboratories are focused on Developmental Biology, and Oceanography.

The facility traces it roots back a laboratory established in 1882 by Hermann Fol with the encouragement of Charles Darwin and continues to work to this day with organisms from the Bay of Villefranche Bay, including protists, ascidians, sea urchins and jellyfish.

== History ==
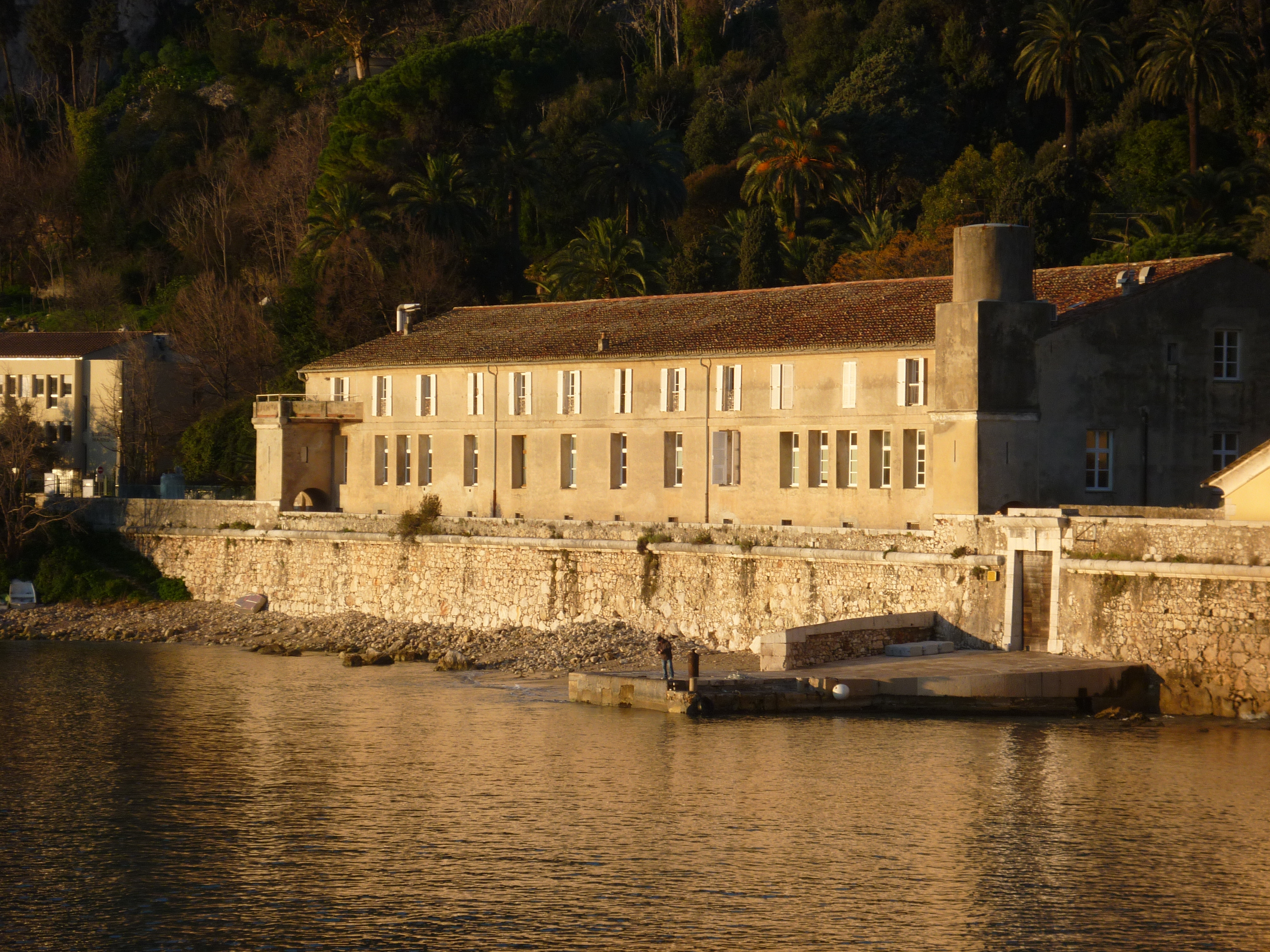
Part of the Observatoire Oceanologique de Villefranche

In 1809 Charles Alexandre Lesueur and François Péron are credited with discovering the exceptional diversity of zooplankton in the bays of Villefranche and Cap de Nice and they were the first to describe new species from the bay (Péron & Lesueur 1809).

In the 1850s, the zoologist Carl Vogt visited Villefranche and studied the planktonic fauna found in the bay, notably the gelatinous zooplankton (Vogt 1852). He was followed by Johannes Peter Müller and Ernst Haeckel who both described planktonic protists, radiolaria, from the Bay of Villefranche (Müller 1858; Haeckel 1860).

In 1882, encouraged by Darwin, the zoologist and discoverer of fertilization Hermann Fol along with Jule Barrois of the Université de Lille, established a laboratory in Villefranche in a former Lazert building. They acquired use of buildings previously leased to the Russian Navy as a coal depot in 1884, the Galériens and the Vielle Forge. Barrois and Fol were forced to give up the facility in 1888 at the demand of Alexis Korotneff of the University of Kiev who had frequented the laboratory in previous years and now wanted to establish a Russian research facility: The "Russian Zoological Station" (Mosse 1952) . Russian, French, and American biologists including Hipployte Pergallo, Aleksei Alekseevich Korotnev, Carl Vogt, Hermann Fol, Jules Henri Barrois, Élie Metchnikoff and Louis Agassiz among others worked on the planktonic fauna and embryos collected in the bay. To this day the Bay of Villefranche remains an exceptional natural resource for the study of plankton. Since the 1930s the facility has been administered by the University of Paris.

== Building ==
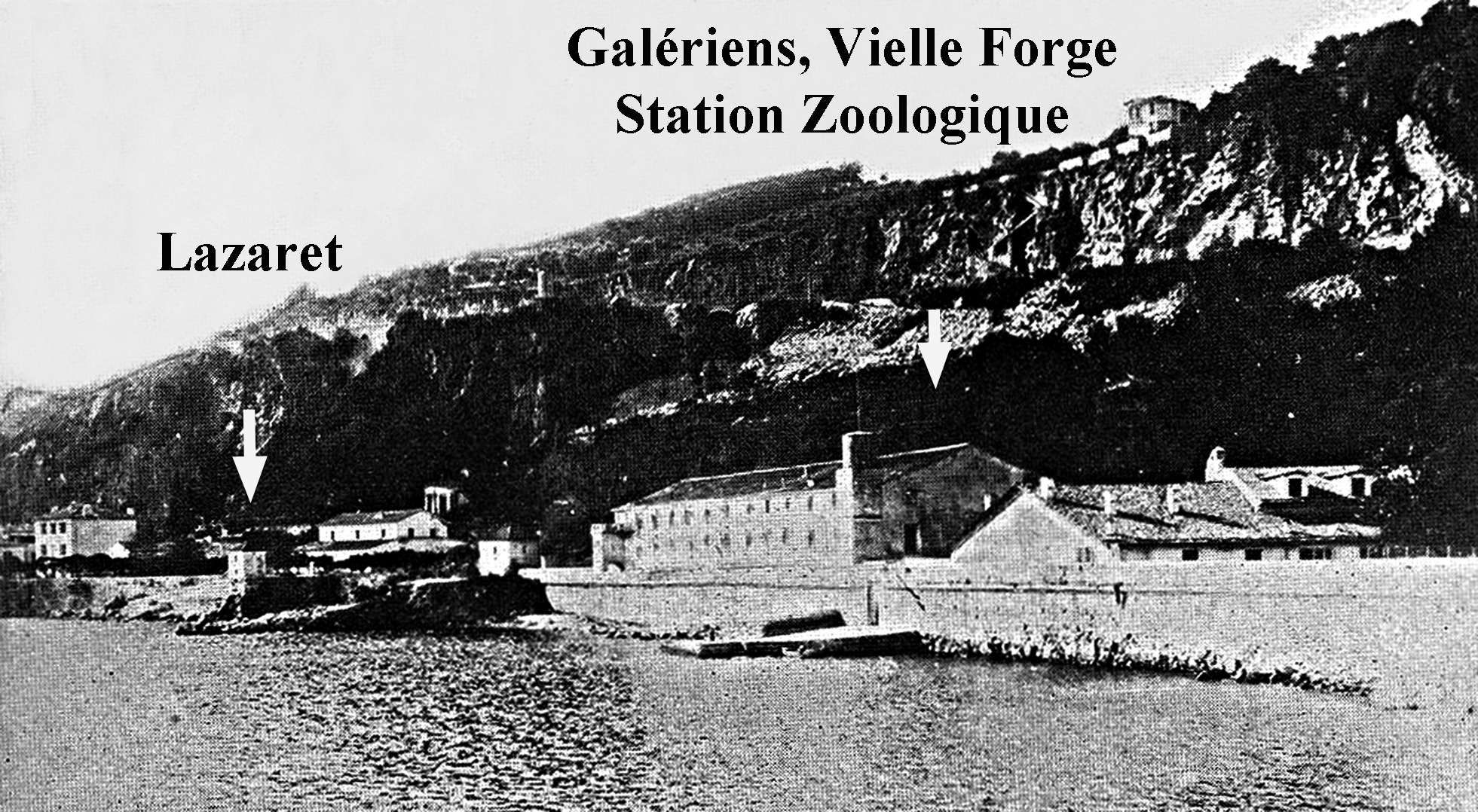
Station Zoologique Vilefranche-sur-mer, ca. 1909

The marine station is situated in historical buildings constructed in 1769 as part of the military harbour of the Kingdom of Sardinia which had Turin as its capital. The main building (bâtiment des galeriens) where the laboratories are now located was first used as a hospital and prison for galley slaves (mainly Turkish prisoners) who manned the war boats built in the adjacent drydock. In 1858 it was leased to the Russian Navy by the then governing authority of the Kingdom of Sardina for use as coal depot.

== Mission ==
- Education: a teaching team composed of faculty members of Université Pierre et Marie Curie oversees many courses in oceanography for French and foreign students enrolled primarily at master's degree level.
- Research: the two laboratories are focused on developmental biology and cell biology and the other on oceanography (biological, biochemical, physical and chemical oceanography).
- Observation: Comprehensive monitoring programs sample both the coastal environment of the Bay of Villefranche and an offshore site, 28 miles from Cap Ferrat. Activities in the Observatory include also research and development of new observation techniques such optical devices, gliders and floats.
