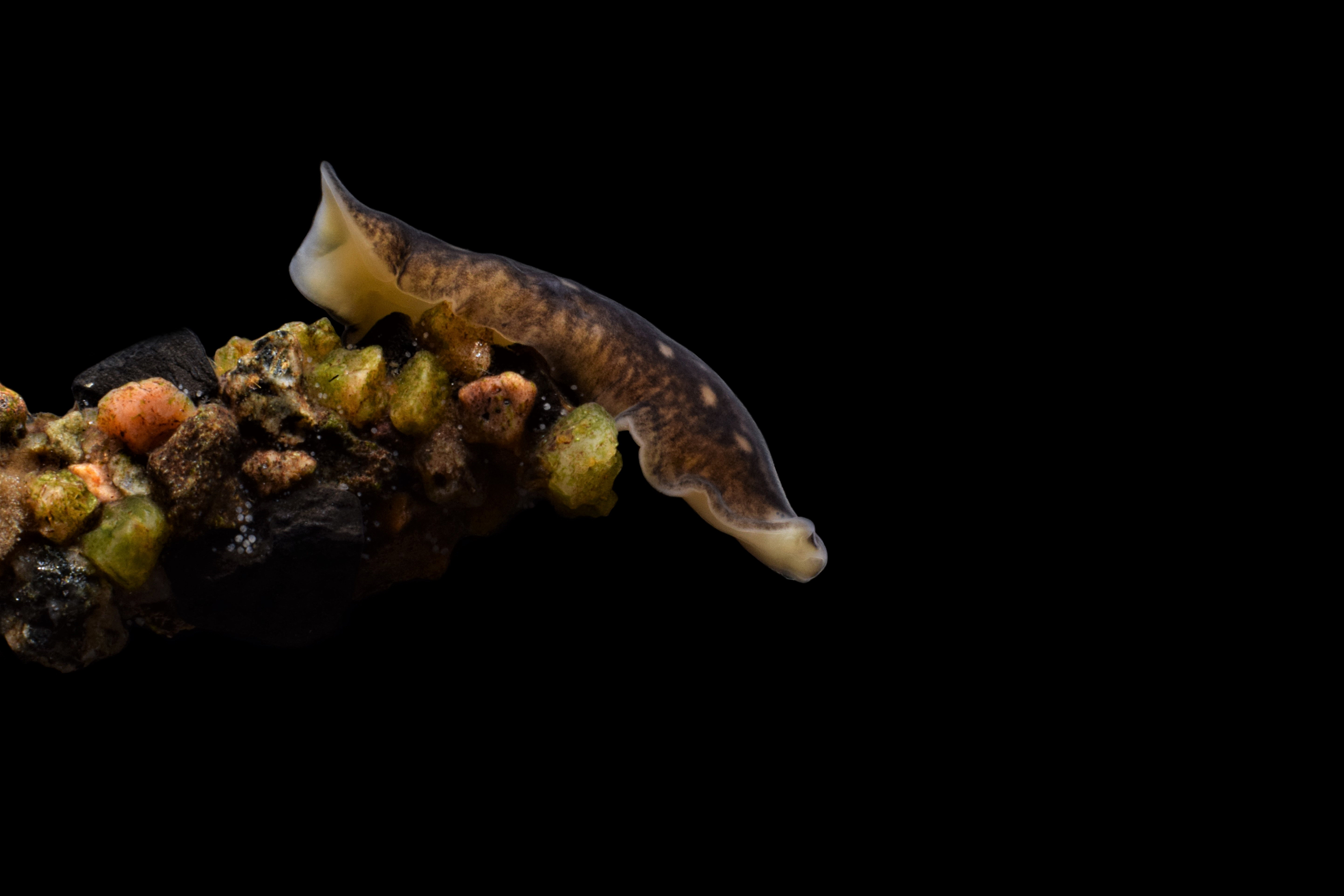
- Baikalobia guttata

Scientific classification
- Kingdom: Animalia
- Phylum: Platyhelminthes
- Order: Tricladida
- Family: Dendrocoelidae
- Genus: Baikalobia; Kenk, 1930

Species
- See text

= Baikalobia =

Genus of planarian

Baikalobia is a genus of freshwater triclad in the family Dendrocoelidae. Species have been documented in Russia.

== Species ==
According to the World Register of Marine Species, Baikalobia contains the following species:

- Baikalobia copulatrix (Korotnev, 1912)
- Baikalobia guttata (Gerstfeldt, 1858)
- Baikalobia pseudoguttata Porfiriev, Zaytseva & Timoshkin, 2010
- Baikalobia raddei (Sabussowa, 1911)
- Baikalobia variegata (Korotnev, 1912)
