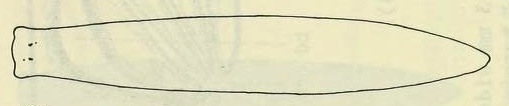
- Dendrocoelopsis alaskensis

Scientific classification
- Kingdom: Animalia
- Phylum: Platyhelminthes
- Order: Tricladida
- Family: Dendrocoelidae
- Genus: Dendrocoelopsis; Kenk, 1930

Species
- 18 species, see text

= Dendrocoelopsis =

Genus of flatworms

Dendrocoelopsis is a genus of freshwater planarians.

== Species ==
The genus Dendrocoelopsis includes the following species:

- Dendrocoelopsis alaskensis Kenk, 1953
- Dendrocoelopsis americana (Hyman, 1939)
- Dendrocoelopsis beauchampi Gourbault, 1969
- Dendrocoelopsis bessoni Gourbault, Benazzi & Hellouet, 1976
- Dendrocoelopsis brementi (de Beauchamp, 1919)
- Dendrocoelopsis chattoni de Beauchamp, 1949
- Dendrocoelopsis ezensis Ichikawa & Okugawa, 1958
- Dendrocoelopsis hymanae Kawakatsu, 1968
- Dendrocoelopsis ichikawai Kawakatsu, 1977
- Dendrocoelopsis kishidae Kawakatsu, Ogawara & Tarui, 1978
- Dendrocoelopsis lactea Ichikawa & Okugawa, 1958
- Dendrocoelopsis oculata (Porfirieva, 1958)
- Dendrocoelopsis piriformis Kenk, 1953
- Dendrocoelopsis sinensis Liu, 1997
- Dendrocoelopsis spinosipenis Kenk, 1925
- Dendrocoelopsis suifenhensis Liu, 1997
- Dendrocoelopsis vaginata Hyman, 1935
- Dendrocoelopsis vandeli de Beauchamp, 1931
