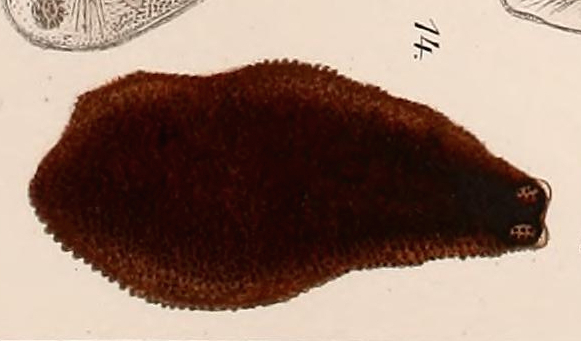
- Papilloplana papillosa

Scientific classification
- Kingdom: Animalia
- Phylum: Platyhelminthes
- Order: Tricladida
- Family: Dendrocoelidae
- Genus: Papilloplana; Kenk, 1974

Species
- See text

Synonyms
- Thysanoplana Graff, 1912-17

= Papilloplana =

Genus of flatworms

Papilloplana is a genus of triclads belonging to the family Dendrocoelidae.

== Species ==
There are four species currently recognized within Papilloplana:

- Papilloplana grisea (Sabussow, 1903)
- Papilloplana leucocephala (Sabussow, 1903)
- Papilloplana papillosa (Korotnev, 1912)
- Papilloplana zebra Grube, 1872
