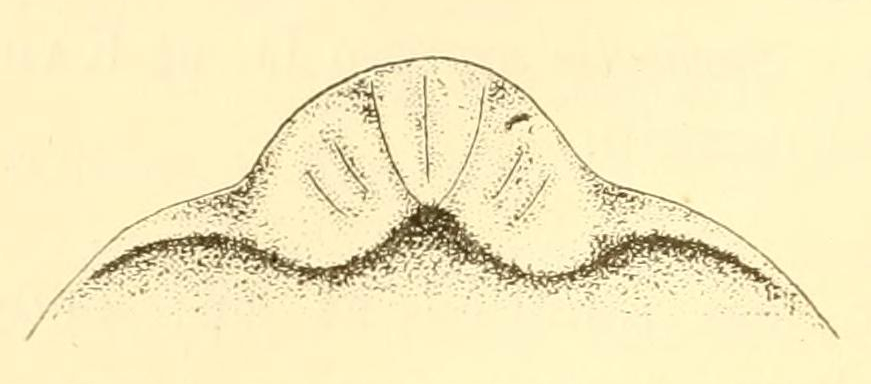
- B. annandalei head

Scientific classification
- Kingdom: Animalia
- Phylum: Platyhelminthes
- Order: Tricladida
- Family: Dendrocoelidae
- Genus: Bdellocephala
- Species: B. annandalei

Binomial name
- Bdellocephala annandalei Ijima & Kaburaki, 1916

= Bdellocephala annandalei =

Species of planarian

Bdellocephala annandalei is a species of freshwater triclad in the family Dendrocoelidae.

== Description ==
Bdellocephala annandalei is described as having a broad, flat body. Its frontal margin is slightly rounded in the middle. It has short lobes, and is a reddish-brown color.
