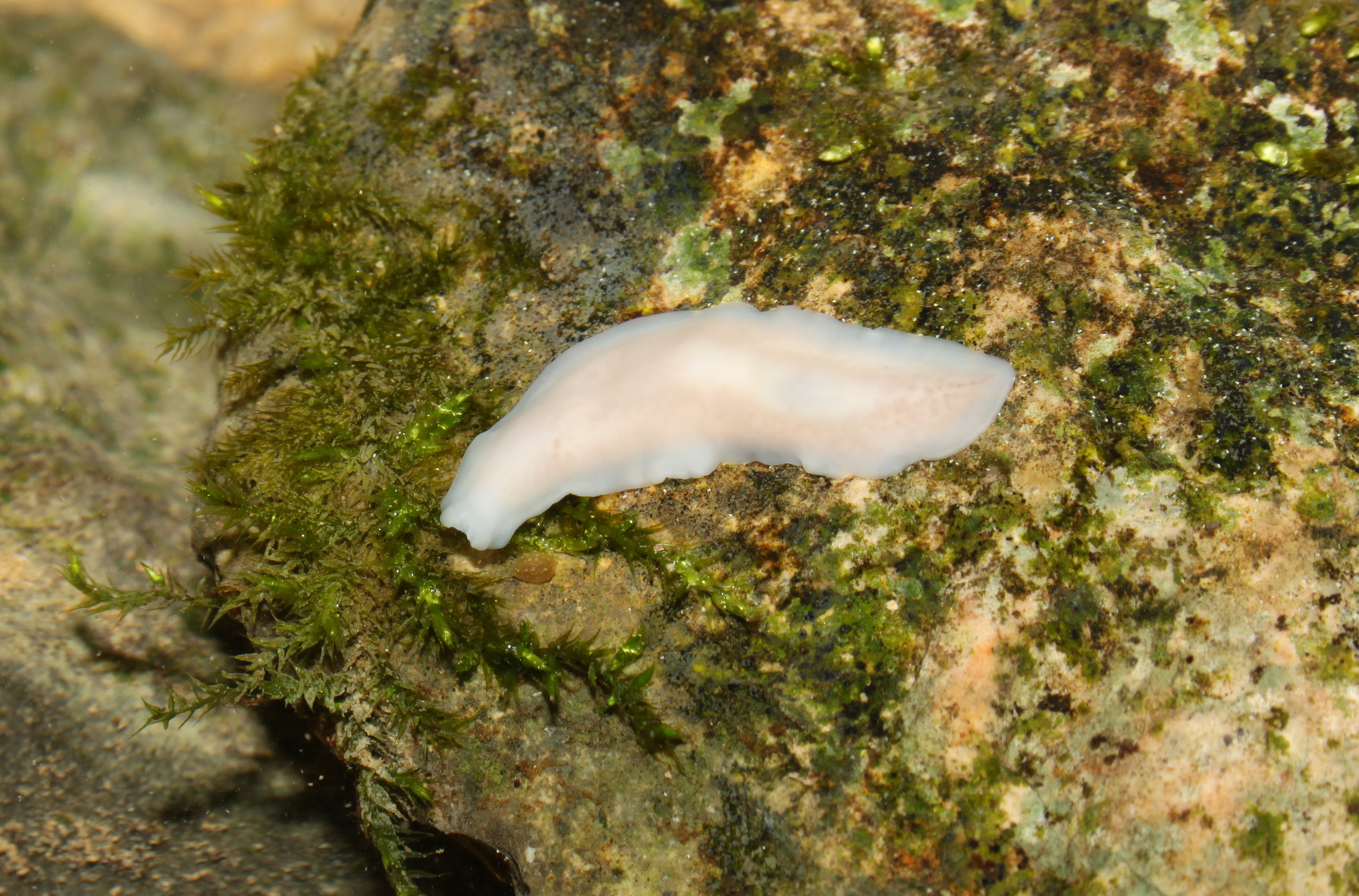
- Dendrocoelum cavaticum

Scientific classification
- Kingdom: Animalia
- Phylum: Platyhelminthes
- Order: Tricladida
- Family: Dendrocoelidae
- Genus: Dendrocoelum; Ørsted, 1844

Synonyms
- Apodendrocoelum de Beauchamp, 1931; Bolbodendrocoelum de Beauchamp, 1932; Dendrocoelides de Beauchamp, 1919; Eudendrocoelum Komarek, 1925; Paradendrocoelum Kenk, 1930; Sorocelopsis Komarek, 1919

= Dendrocoelum =

Genus of flatworms

Dendrocoelum is a genus of freshwater triclad. Over one hundred species have been described.

== Description ==
The genus Dendrocoelum is characterized by the presence of a well-developed musculo-glandular organ known as an adenodactyl, which is also present in other genera of Dendrocoelidae. In Dendrocoelum, the adenodactyl is cone-shaped and has a distinct bulb, as well as a papilla, and its lumen receives the secretions of several glands.

== Species ==
The following species belong to the genus Dendrocoelum:

- Dendrocoelum abditum Kenk, 1940
- Dendrocoelum adenodactylosum (Stanković & Komárek, 1927)
- Dendrocoelum affine Codreanu & Balcesco, 1970
- Dendrocoelum agile de Beauchamp, 1932
- Dendrocoelum alba (Linnaeus, 1746)
- Dendrocoelum albidum Kenk, 1978
- Dendrocoelum album (Steinmann, 1910)
- Dendrocoelum alexandrinae Codreanu & Balcesco, 1970
- Dendrocoelum amplum Harrath & Sluys, 2012
- Dendrocoelum angarense (Gerstfeldt, 1858)
- Dendrocoelum apodendrocoeloideum Dyganova, 1976
- Dendrocoelum atriostrictum Codreanu & Balcesco, 1967
- Dendrocoelum banaticum Codreanu & Balcesco, 1967
- Dendrocoelum barbei de Beauchamp, 1956
- Dendrocoelum beauchampi Del Papa, 1952
- Dendrocoelum benazii Del Papa, 1973
- Dendrocoelum boettgeri An der Lan, 1955
- Dendrocoelum bohemicum Komarek & Kunst, 1956
- Dendrocoelum botosaneanui Del Papa, 1965
- Dendrocoelum brachyphallus (Beauchamp, 1929)
- Dendrocoelum brandtii Bohmig, 1893
- Dendrocoelum brunneomarginatum Bohmig, 1893
- Dendrocoelum caecum (Komarek, 1926)
- Dendrocoelum carpathicum Komarek, 1926
- Dendrocoelum caspicum Porfirjeva & Dyganova, 1973
- Dendrocoelum caucasicum Porfirjeva, 1958
- Dendrocoelum cavaticum Fries, 1874
- Dendrocoelum chappuisi de Beauchamp, 1932
- Dendrocoelum clujanum Codreanu, 1943
- Dendrocoelum codreanui Gourbault, 1967
- Dendrocoelum coecum (Komarek, 1926)
- Dendrocoelum coiffaiti De Beauchamp, 1956
- Dendrocoelum collini (de Beauchamp, 1919)
- Dendrocoelum constrictum Harrath & Sluys, 2012
- Dendrocoelum cruciferum (Stankovic, 1969)
- Dendrocoelum dani Bromley, 1982
- Dendrocoelum debeauchampianum Codreanu & Balcesco, 1967
- Dendrocoelum decemoculatum (Komarek, 1919)
- Dendrocoelum decoratum Kenk, 1978
- Dendrocoelum dorsivittatum Kenk, 1978
- Dendrocoelum dumitrescuae Gourbault, 1967
- Dendrocoelum duplum Harrath & Sluys, 2012
- Dendrocoelum findeneggi (Reisinger, 1971)
- Dendrocoelum fuscum Stimpson, 1857
- Dendrocoelum geticum Codreanu & Balcesco, 1970
- Dendrocoelum gineti de Beauchamp, 1954
- Dendrocoelum graffi Wilhelmi, 1909
- Dendrocoelum grimmi Dyganova, 1983
- Dendrocoelum hankoi (Gelei J., 1927)
- Dendrocoelum hercynicum Flössner, 1959
- Dendrocoelum hussoni Sauber, 1970
- Dendrocoelum inexspectatum Vila-Farré & Sluys, 2011
- Dendrocoelum infernale (Steinmann, 1907)
- Dendrocoelum italicum Vialli, 1937
- Dendrocoelum jablanicense Stanković & Komárek, 1927
- Dendrocoelum kenki De Beauchamp, 1937
- Dendrocoelum komareki Stanković, 1969
- Dendrocoelum lactea (Müller OF, 1773)
- Dendrocoelum lacteum Müller, 1774
- Dendrocoelum lacustre Stanković, 1938
- Dendrocoelum lescherae Gourbault, 1970
- Dendrocoelum leporii Stocchino & Sluys, 2017
- Dendrocoelum lipophallus (de Beauchamp, 1929)
- Dendrocoelum longipenis Komarek, 1916
- Dendrocoelum lychnidicum (Stankovic, 1969)
- Dendrocoelum maculatum Stanković & Komárek, 1927
- Dendrocoelum magnum (Stankovic, 1969)
- Dendrocoelum mariae Stocchino & Sluys, 2013
- Dendrocoelum minimum Kenk, 1978
- Dendrocoelum mrazekii (Vejdovsky, 1895)
- Dendrocoelum nausicaae Schmidt, 1861
- Dendrocoelum nuraghum Stocchino & Sluys, 2013
- Dendrocoelum obstinatum Stocchino & Sluys, 2017
- Dendrocoelum ochridense (Stankovic & Komarek, 1927)
- Dendrocoelum orghidani Codreanu & Balcesco, 1967
- Dendrocoelum oxyhidoni Codreanu & Balcesco, 1967
- Dendrocoelum pannonicum (Mehely, 1927)
- Dendrocoelum parisi (de Beauchamp, 1929)
- Dendrocoelum parvioculatum de Beauchamp, 1932
- Dendrocoelum plesiophthalmum De Beauchamp, 1937
- Dendrocoelum polymorphum Codreanu & Balcesco, 1967
- Dendrocoelum prespense (Stankovic, 1969)
- Dendrocoelum pulcherrimum Girard, 1850
- Dendrocoelum punctatum (Pallas, 1774)
- Dendrocoelum puteale Kenk, 1930
- Dendrocoelum quadrioculatum (Graff, 1875)
- Dendrocoelum racovitzae de Beauchamp, 1949
- Dendrocoelum regnaudi (de Beauchamp, 1919)
- Dendrocoelum remyi De Beauchamp, 1926
- Dendrocoelum romanodanubiale (Codreanu, 1949)
- Dendrocoelum romanovae Dyganova, 1976
- Dendrocoelum sanctinaumae (Stanković & Komárek, 1927)
- Dendrocoelum sinisae Kenk, 1978
- Dendrocoelum sollaudi de Beauchamp, 1931
- Dendrocoelum spatiosum Vila-Farré & Sluys, 2011
- Dendrocoelum spelaeum (Kenk, 1924)
- Dendrocoelum sphaerophallus (de Beauchamp, 1929)
- Dendrocoelum spinosipenis Kenk, 1925
- Dendrocoelum stenophallous Codreanu & Balcesco, 1967
- Dendrocoelum subterraneum Komarek, 1919
- Dendrocoelum superbum Girard, 1850
- Dendrocoelum superficiale (Porfirieva, 1958)
- Dendrocoelum tismanae Codreanu & Balcesco, 1967
- Dendrocoelum translucidum Kenk, 1978
- Dendrocoelum truncatum (Leidy, 1851)
- Dendrocoelum tubuliferum De Beauchamp, 1919
- Dendrocoelum tuzetae Gourbault, 1965
- Dendrocoelum vaillanti De Beauchamp, 1955
- Dendrocoelum vesiculosum Stocchino & Sluys, 2013
- Dendrocoelum vittatum Diesing, 1850
- Dendrocoelum voinovi (Codreanu, 1929)
- Dendrocoelum warnimonti Hoffmann, 1964
