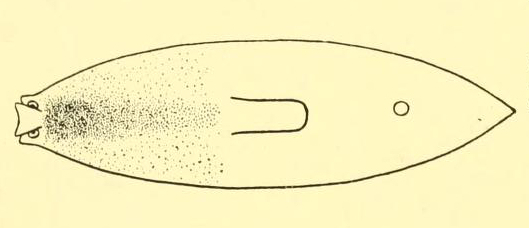
- Bdellocephala punctata

Scientific classification
- Kingdom: Animalia
- Phylum: Platyhelminthes
- Order: Tricladida
- Family: Dendrocoelidae
- Genus: Bdellocephala de Man, 1875

Species
- See text

= Bdellocephala =

Genus of flatworms

Bdellocephala is a genus of freshwater triclad that inhabits different regions of Eurasia.

== Description ==
As in other genera of the family Dendrocoelidae, species of Bdellocephala have an anterior adhesive organ. However, differently from other dendrocoelids, species of Bdellocephala lack a well-developed penis papilla in the male copulatory apparatus, which is uncommon in freshwater planarians.

== Species ==
- Bdellocephala angarensis
- Bdellocephala annandalei
- Bdellocephala baicalensis
- Bdellocephala bathyalis
- Bdellocephala borealis
- Bdellocephala brunnea
- Bdellocephala grubiiformis
- Bdellocephala melanocinerea
- Bdellocephala punctata
- Bdellocephala roseocula
- Bdellocephala stellomaculata
- Bdellocephala ushkaniensis
