= Charles Barrois =

French geologist and palaeontologist (1851–1939)

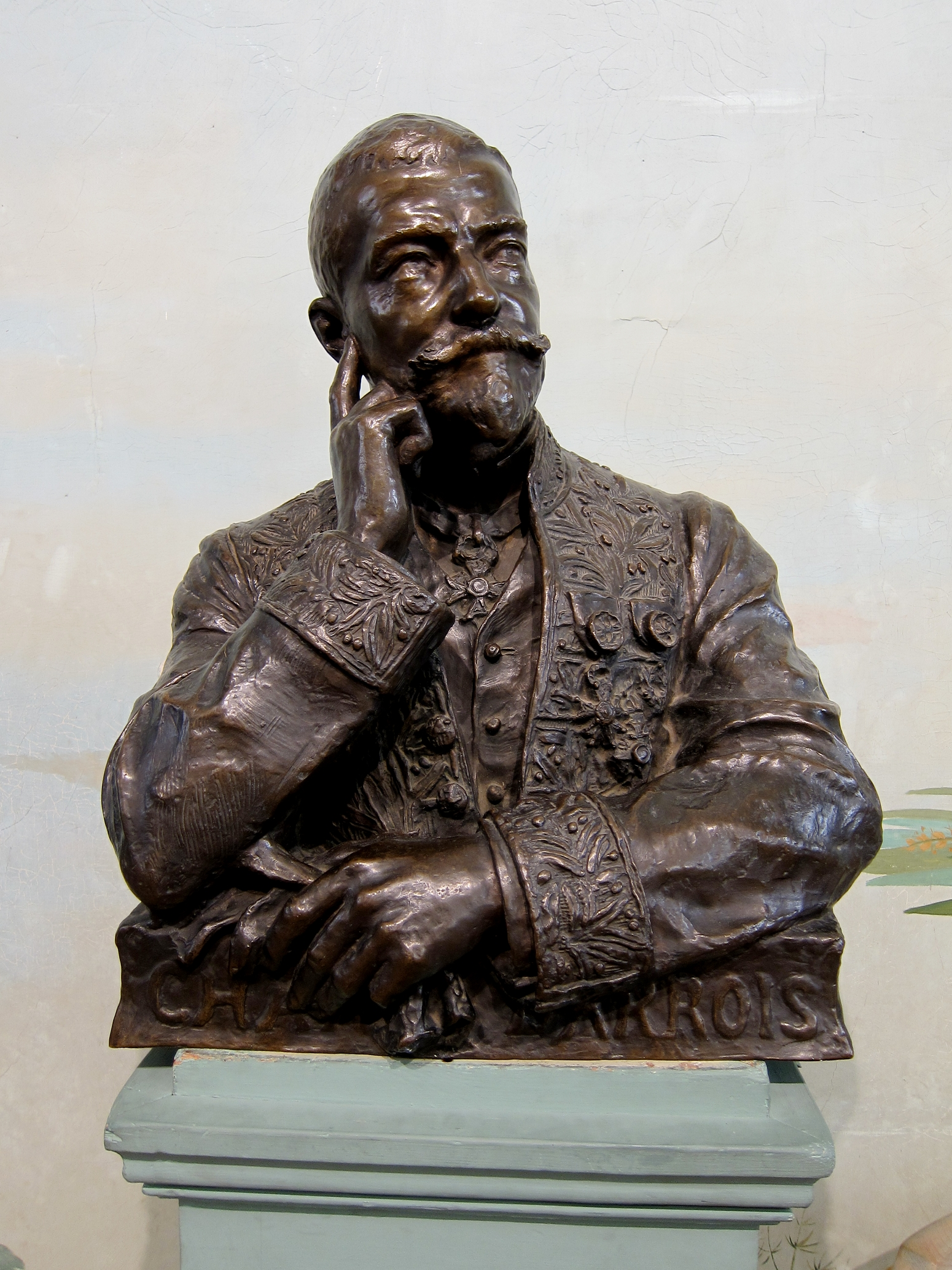
Bust of Barrois in the Lille Natural History Museum

Charles Eugene Barrois (21 August 1851 – 5 November 1939) was a French geologist and palaeontologist.

== Life ==
Barrois was born at Lille and educated at the Jesuit College of St Joseph in that town, where he studied geology under Professor Jules Gosselet.

His first comprehensive work was Recherches sur le terrain crétacé supérieur de l’Angleterre et de l'Irlande, published in the Mémoires de la societé geologique du Nord in 1876. In this essay the palaeontological zones in the Chalk and Upper Greensand of Britain were for the first time marked out in detail, and the results of Dr Barrois's original researches formed the basis of subsequent work, and were in all leading features confirmed. In 1876 Dr Barrois was appointed a collaborateur to the French Geological Survey, and a professor of geology in the University of Lille in 1877. In 1936 he was appointed member of the Pontifical Academy of Sciences.

In other memoirs, among which may be mentioned those on the Cretaceous rocks of the Ardennes and of the Basin of Oviedo, Spain; on the (Devonian) Calcaire d’Erbray; on the Palaeozoic rocks of Brittany and of northern Spain; and on the granitic and metamorphic rocks of Brittany, Dr Barrois proved himself an accomplished petrologist as well as palaeontologist and field-geologist.

In 1881 he was awarded the Bigsby medal, and in 1901 the Wollaston medal by the Geological Society of London. He was chosen member of the institute (Academy of Sciences) in 1904 and a Foreign Member of the Royal Society of London. In 1907, he created the Musée Houiller (Carboniferous Museum) alongside the Museum Gosselet in Lille.

Barrois's work covered the entire field of geology, and his work was rigorous and based on detailed observation. His fame spread internationally, even before he was recognized in his own country, and he was honored by many European and American academies. He was elected a Foreign Honorary Member of the American Academy of Arts and Sciences in 1915. He was made Chevalier of the Légion d'honneur at the age of 37, and was named commander in 1923.

He died at St Genevieve-en-Caux and is buried in the East Cemetery in Lille.

== Family ==
He was the brother of zoologist Jules Henri Barrois.
