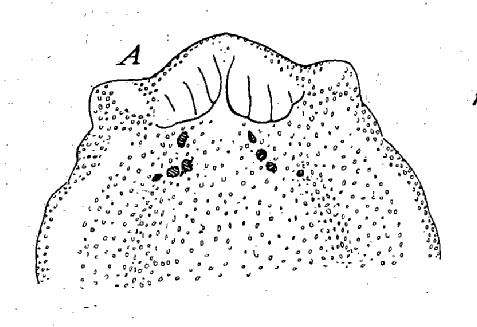
- A. maroccanum head

Scientific classification
- Kingdom: Animalia
- Phylum: Platyhelminthes
- Order: Tricladida
- Family: Dendrocoelidae
- Genus: Acromyadenium de Beauchamp, 1931
- Species: A. maroccanum

Binomial name
- Acromyadenium maroccanum de Beauchamp, 1931

= Acromyadenium =

Genus of flatworms

Acromyadenium is a genus of freshwater triclad belonging to the family Dendrocoelidae. It is monotypic, containing the sole species Acromyadenium maroccanum.
