= Jules Henri Barrois =

French zoologist (1852-1943)

Jules Henri Barrois (3 September 1852 – 1943) was a French zoologist and head of the marine zoological laboratory (l'Observatoire Oceanologique de Villefranche) at Villefranche-sur-Mer from the early 1880s. He was the brother of Charles Barrois (1851–1939), geologist and palaeontologist, and student of Alfred Mathieu Giard (1846–1908) at Université de Lille.

== Publications ==
- Mémoire sur l'embryologie des Bryozaires Mémoire sur l'embryologie des Némertes, dissertation presented to the "Faculté des sciences" in Paris, 1877 - Memoir on the embryology of bryozoans; Memoire on the embryology of nemerteans.
- Mémoire sur les membranes embryonnaires des Salpes, 1881 - Memoire on the embryonic membranes of Salpidae.
- Études complémentaires sur la métamorphose des bryozoaires, 1925 - Complementary studies on the metamorphosis of bryozoans.
- Étude sur la formation du polypide des bryozoaires, 1927 - Study on the formation of polypide in bryozoans.
