= Karel Purkyně =

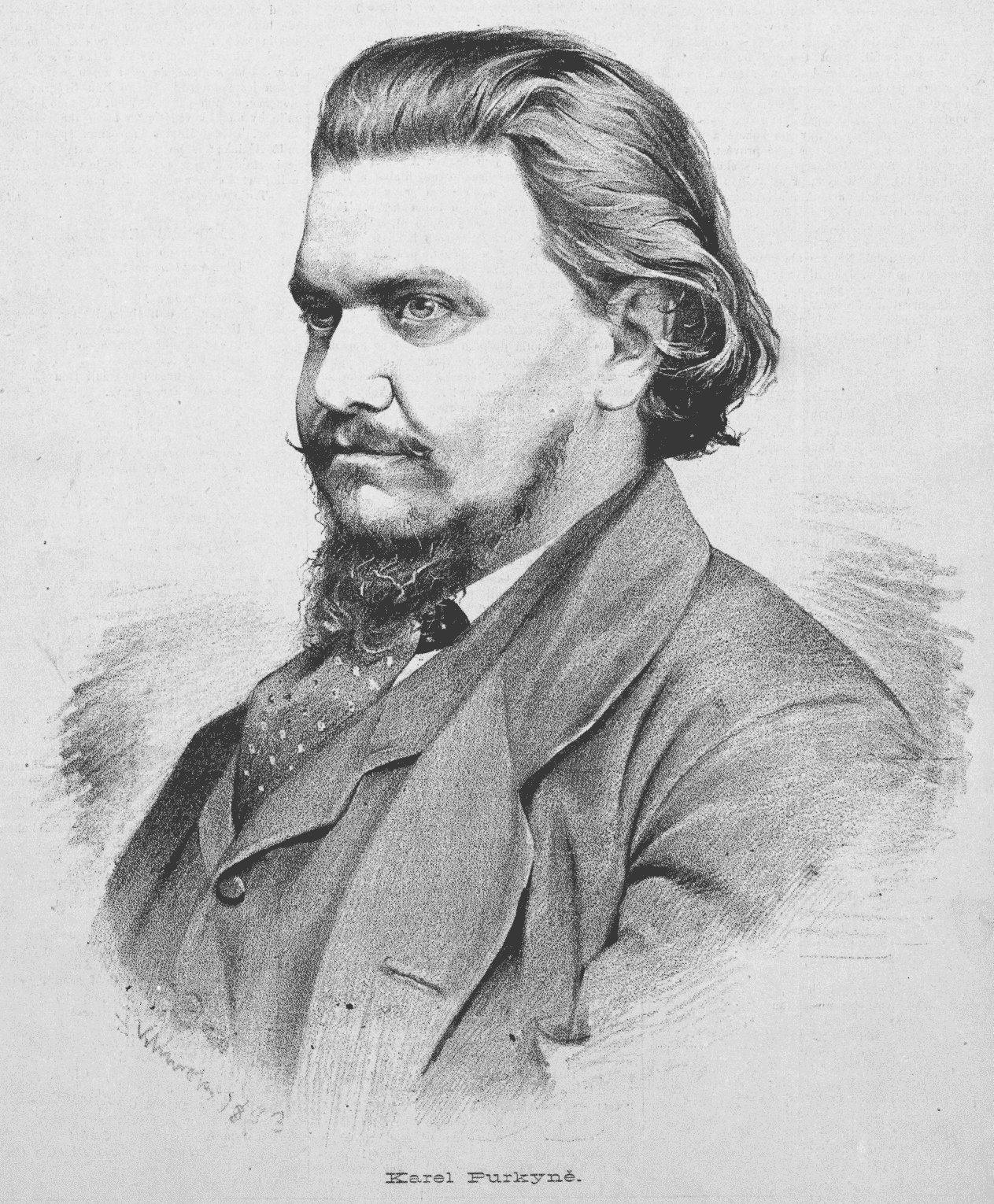
Portrait of Purkyně by Jan Vilímek

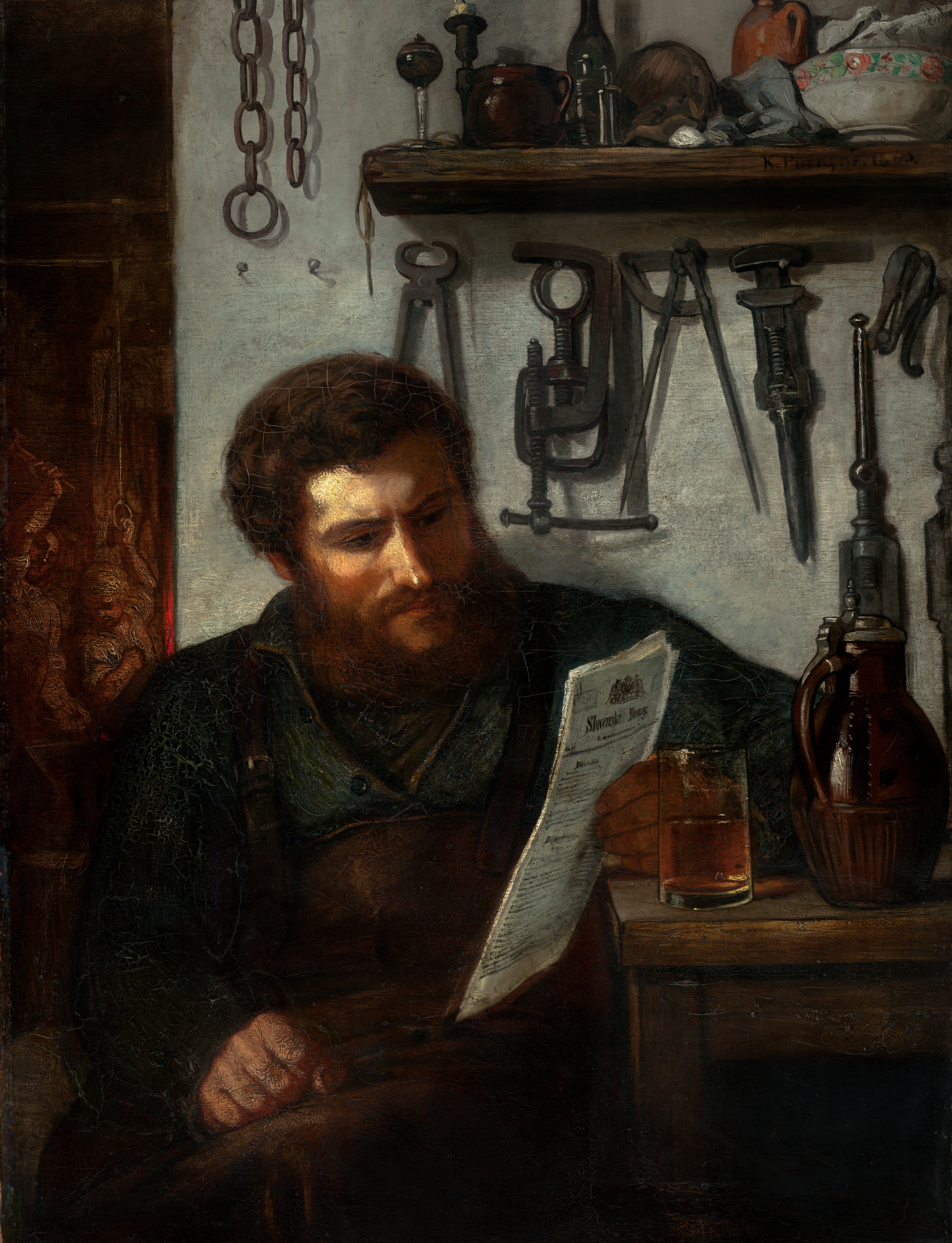
Portrait of a Blacksmith (1860)

Karel Purkyně (15 March 1834 – 5 April 1868) was a Czech painter and art critic. He was one of the most prominent proponents of realism in Czech art in the second half of the 19th century.

== Biography ==
Karel Purkyně was born on 15 March 1834 in Breslau (now Wrocław, Poland). He was the son of the physiologist and anatomist Jan Evangelista Purkyně, and developed an interest in art while still young. Early influences included the Baroque painters Karel Škréta and Petr Brandl and the paintings of the Dutch Golden Age. He spent a year in Munich studying with Johann Baptist Berdellé (1813–1876) before traveling to Paris, where he worked with Thomas Couture; there he copied paintings by the Old Masters and encountered the work of contemporary French artists. He was particularly struck by the works of Gustave Courbet.

Upon returning to Prague, Purkyně became known primarily as a portraitist, though a handful of works in other genres are known. He also made a name for himself as an organiser of artistic events and as an art critic. He died in Prague on 5 April 1868.
