= Purkyně (crater) =

Crater on the Moon

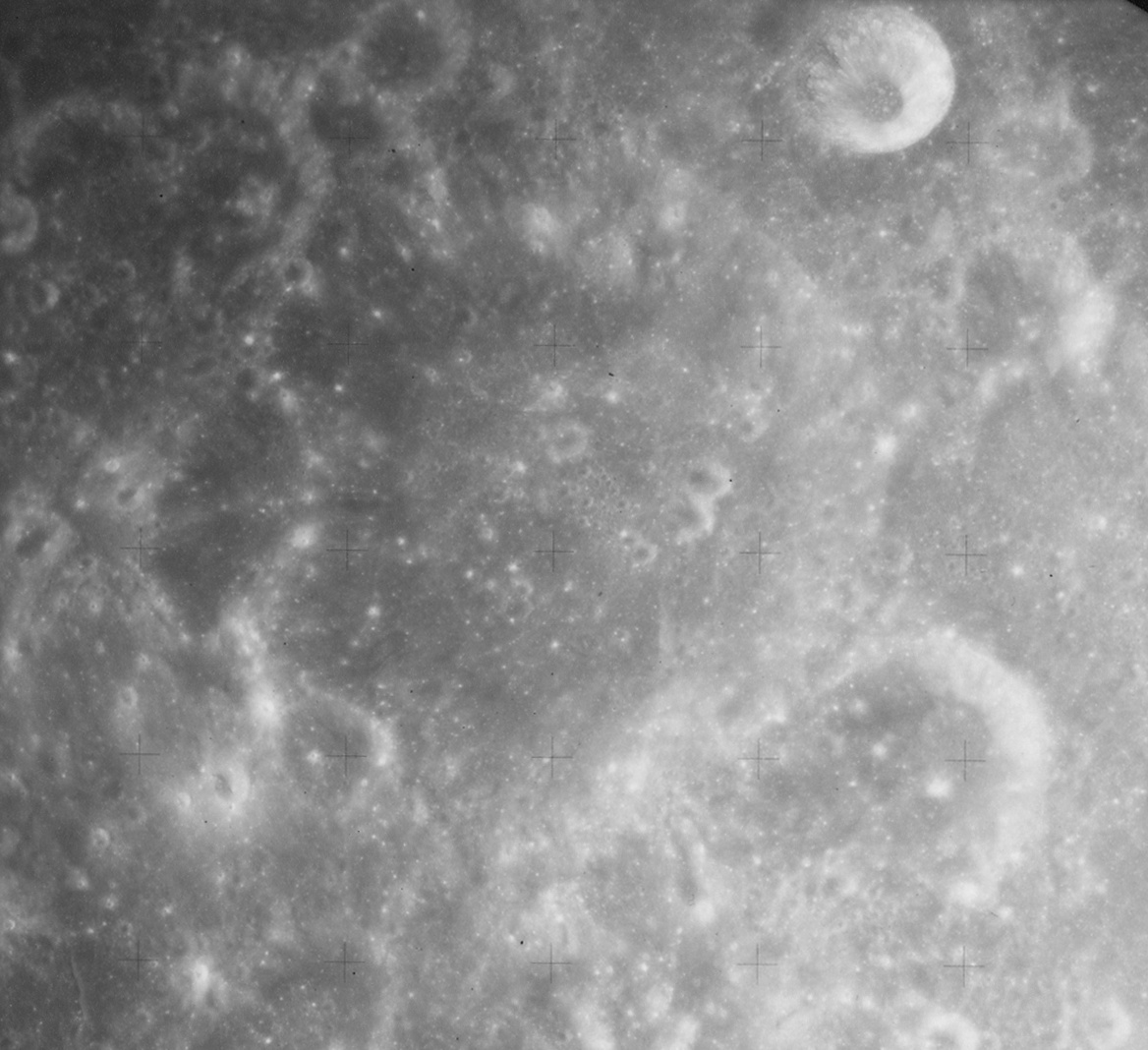
- Apollo 15 Mapping Camera image
- Coordinates: 1.6°S 94.9°E
- Diameter: 48 km
- Depth: Unknown
- Colongitude: 266° at sunrise
- Eponym: Jan E. Purkyně

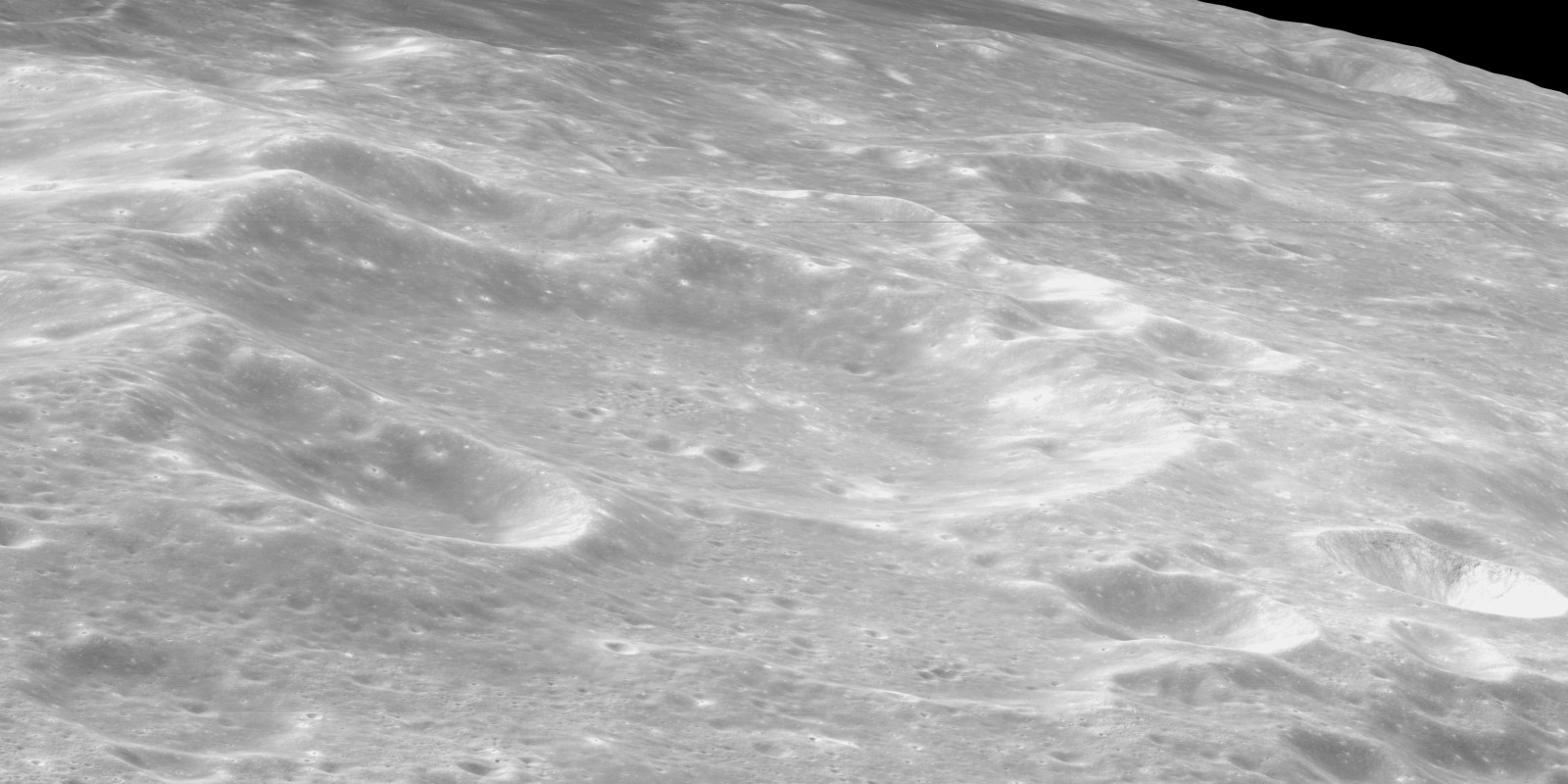
Oblique view from Apollo 17

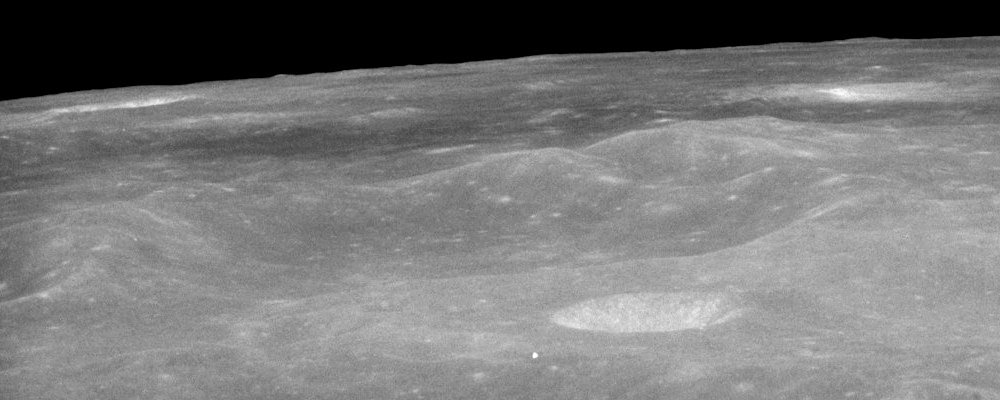
Oblique view from Apollo 11

Purkyně is a lunar impact crater that lies just beyond the eastern limb of the Moon, on the far side from the Earth. When conditions of libration and sunlight allow, this crater can be viewed from the Earth, although it is seen from a very low angle and not much detail can be seen. This crater lies just to the west of the larger crater Wyld, and to the north-northwest of the even bigger Hirayama. To the west and northwest of Purkyně is the Mare Smythii.

This crater has a raised, circular rim that has become worn. The satellite crater Purkyně K intrudes into the southeastern rim. The crater is otherwise only marked by a number of tiny craterlets. The interior floor is relatively level and featureless, with only a pair of tiny craters along the eastern side.

== Satellite craters ==
By convention these features are identified on lunar maps by placing the letter on the side of the crater midpoint that is closest to Purkyně.

Purkyně	Latitude	Longitude	Diameter
D	1.0° S	96.0° E	13 km
K	2.7° S	95.4° E	21 km
S	1.8° S	90.6° E	34 km
U	0.7° S	91.9° E	51 km
V	0.8° S	92.7° E	24 km

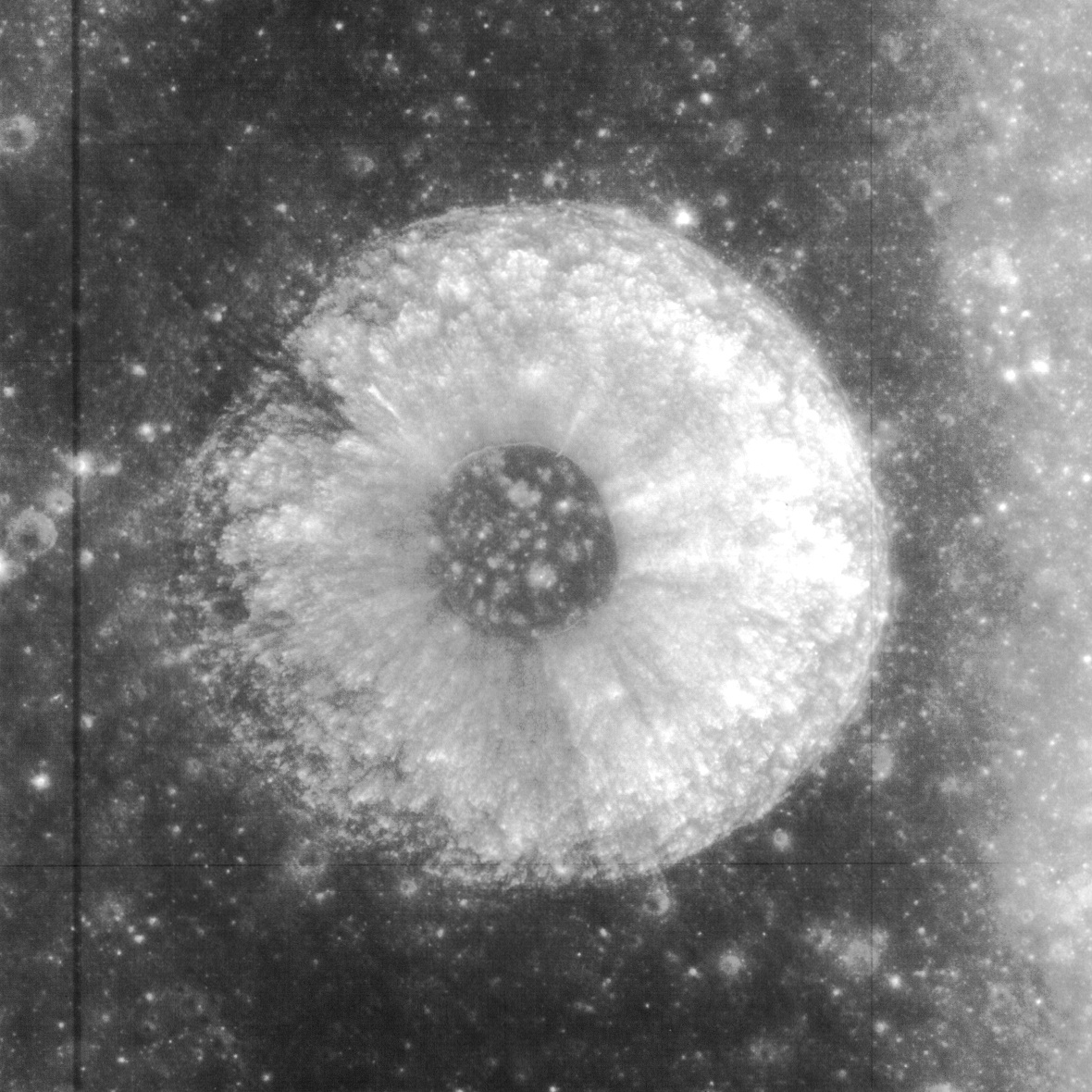
Purkyně D (Apollo 15 Panoramic Camera image)

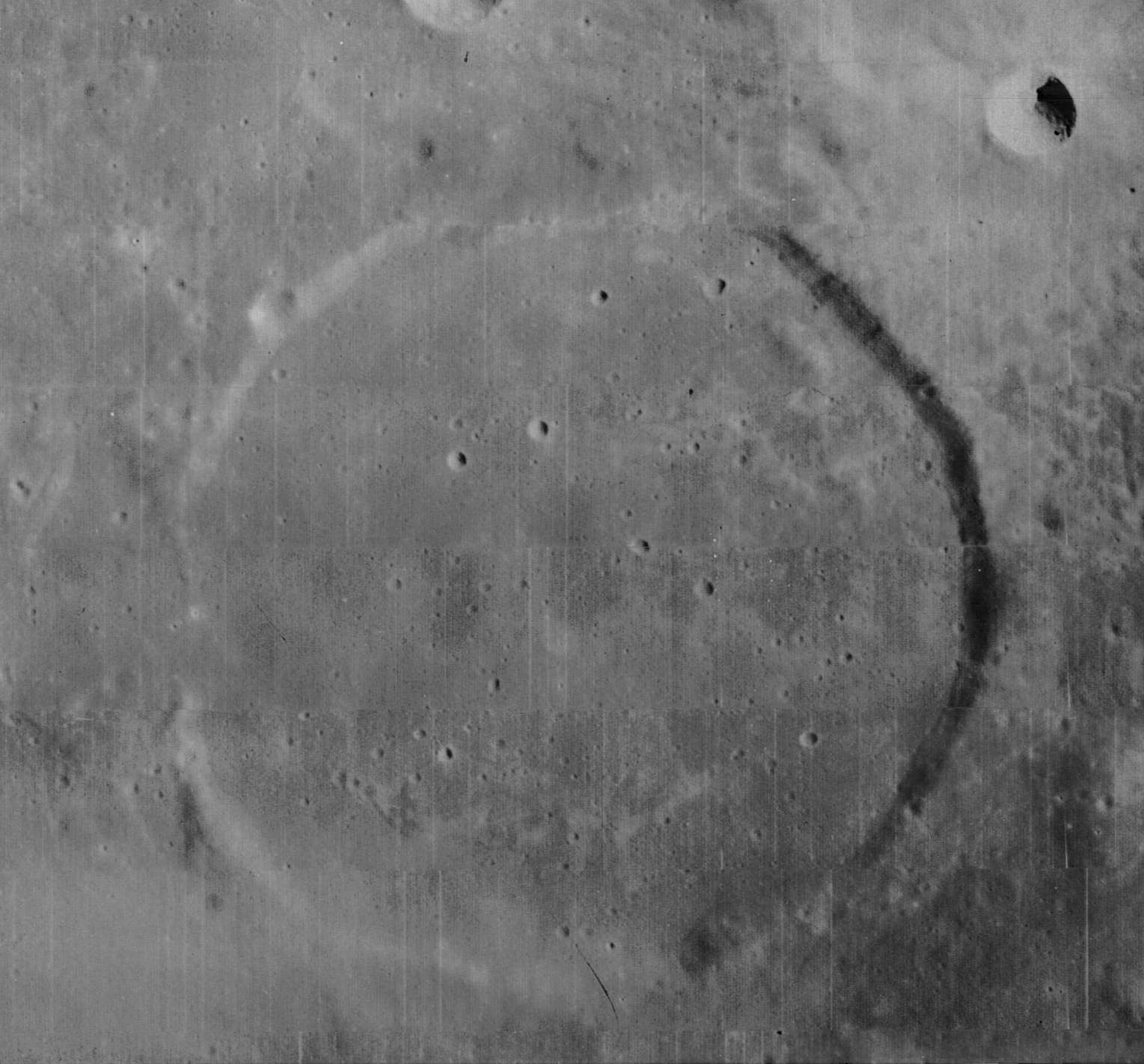
Purkyně S (Lunar Orbiter 1 image)

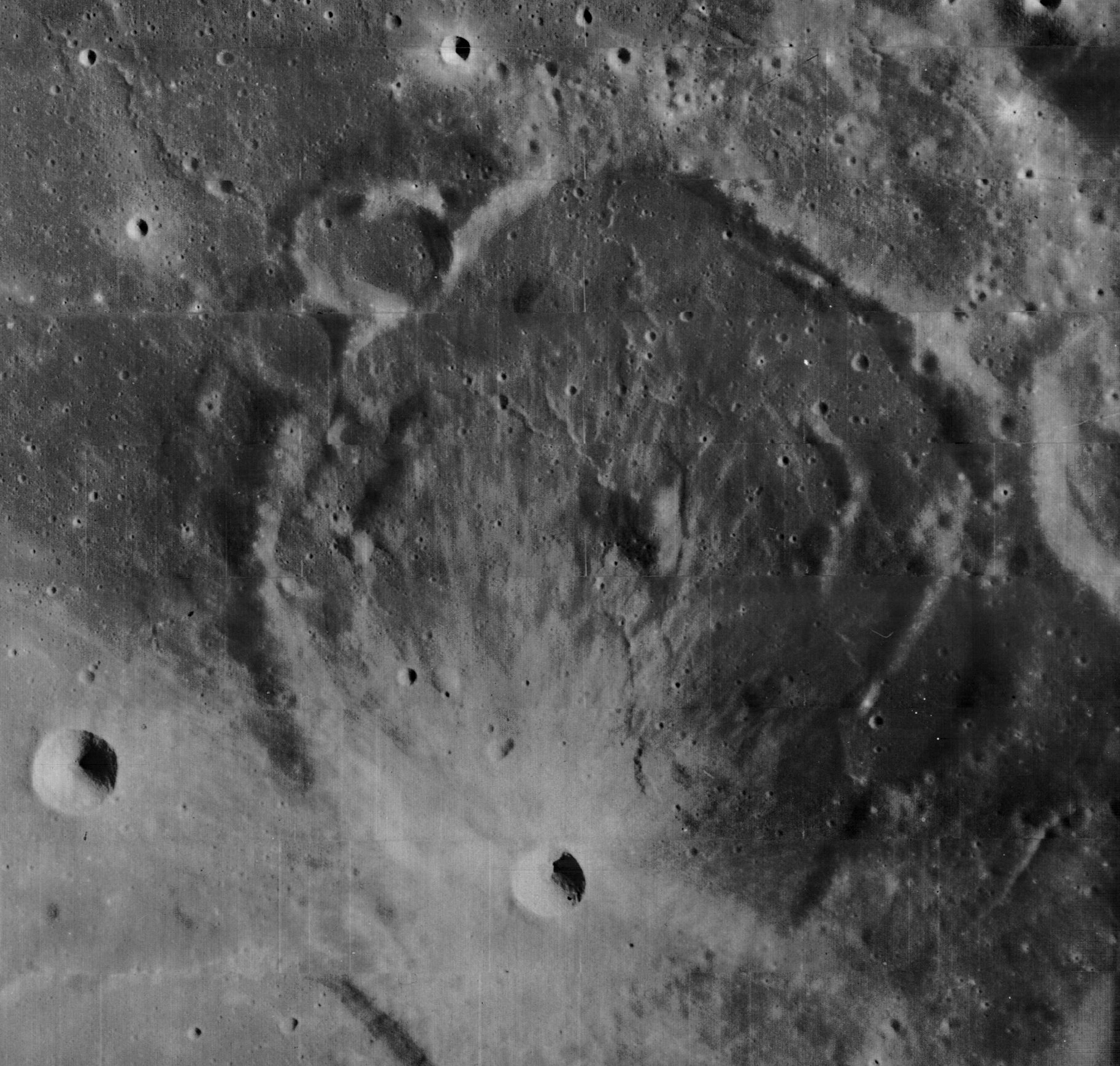
Purkyně U (Lunar Orbiter 1 image)

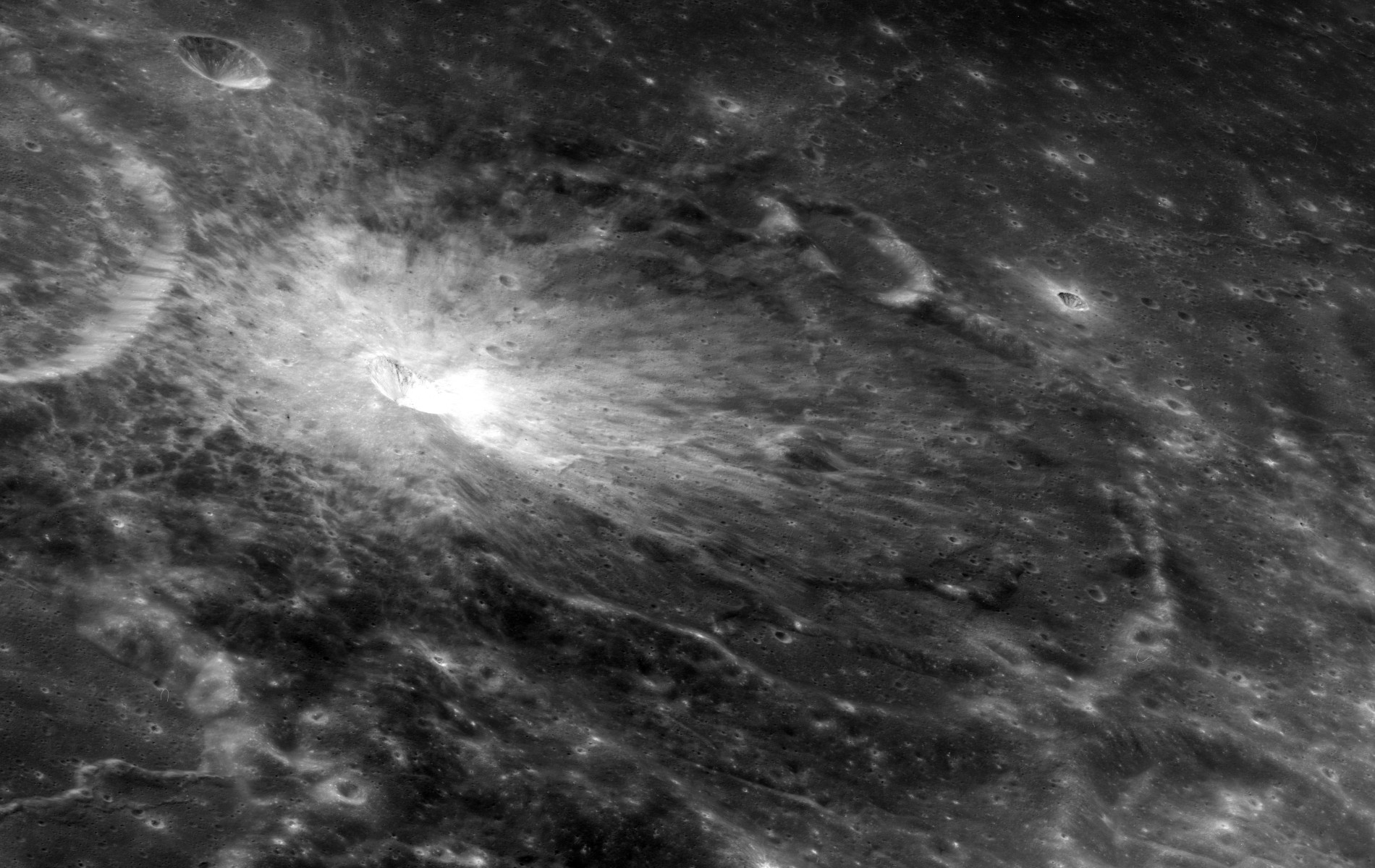
Purkyně U (Apollo 17 Panoramic Camera image)

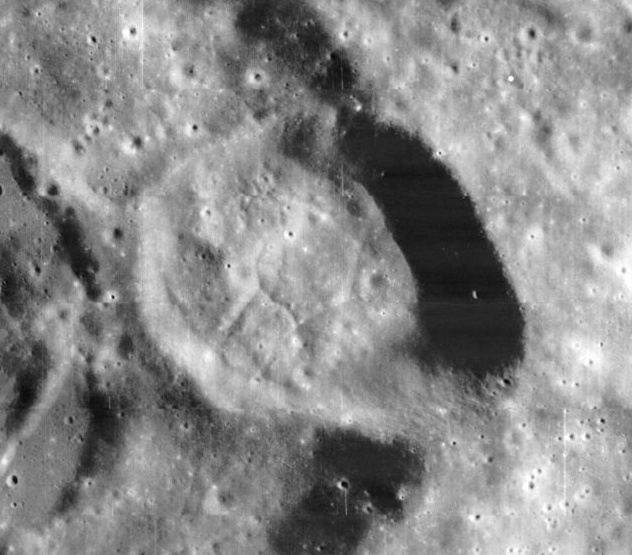
Purkyně V (Lunar Orbiter 1 image)
