= Compressorium =

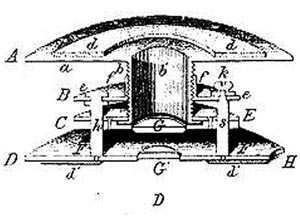
Compressorium by Jan Evangelista Purkyně

The compressorium (plural: compressoria) is a scientific apparatus for applying pressure to a sample for examination with a microscope.

Widely used by microscopists in the 19th century, they were produced by companies such as Bausch and Lomb.

Many versions of compressoria were developed over the years, with one of the first attributed to the famous histologist Jan Evangelista Purkyně, see picture.

Compressoria were still used in the twenty-first century for the identification of Trichinella worms in samples.
