= Aleksei Korotnev =

Russian zoologist

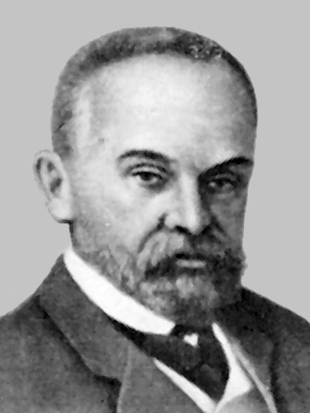
A. A. Korotnev.

Aleksei Alekseevich Korotnev (15 February 1854, Moscow – 14 June 1915, Odessa) was a Russian zoologist.

Korotnev graduated from Moscow University in 1876 and gained his doctorate there in 1881. In 1887, he became a professor at the St. Vladimir Imperial University of Kiev. In 1885 and in 1890-91, he made extensive zoological collections in the Indian Ocean and Pacific Ocean regions. In 1886, he began studies at Observatoire Oceanologique de Villefranche (Villafranca, France). Korotnev also studied the fauna of Lake Baikal between 1900 and 1902. His principal work was on the embryonic development of cnidarians, bryozoans, tunicates and insects. He was a corresponding member of the St. Petersburg Academy of Sciences (1903).

== Taxa named in honour ==
The following taxa have been named in honour (eponyms) of Aleksei Alekseevich Korotnev:

Gastropoda:

- Korotnewia Kozhov, 1936
- Korotnewia korotnevi (Lindholm, 1909)
- Cincinna korotnevi (Lindholm, 1909)
- Pseudancylastrum korotnevi Starobogatov, 1989
- Choanomphalus korotnevi Lindholm, 1909

Bivalvia:

- Amesoda korotniewii (W. Dybowski, 1902)
- Euglesa korotnevi (Lindholm, 1909)

Crustacea:

- Baicalasellus korotnevi (Semenkevich, 1924)
