= Roman Kenk =

Slovenian-American zoologist (1898–1988)

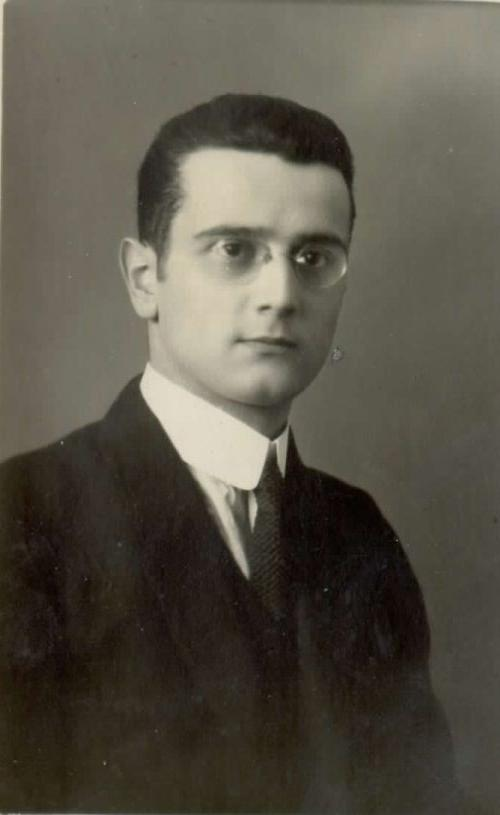
- Born: November 25, 1898; Ljubljana, Slovenia
- Died: October 2, 1988 (aged 89); Washington, D. C., United States
- Scientific career
- Fields: Zoology, Helminthology
- Workplaces: Smithsonian Institution
- Author abbrev. (zoology): Kenk

Roman Kenk (November 25, 1898 – October 2, 1988) was a Slovenian, later American, zoologist.

== Life ==
Roman Kenk was born in Ljubljana and baptized Roman Marija Kenk. He received his PhD in zoology at the University of Graz, Austria, in 1921, and worked at the University of Ljubljana.

From 1931 to 1932, and again in the summer of 1933, Kenk stayed at the University of Virginia in the United States, where he met Ada Antonio Blanco, who had come from Puerto Rico. They married in 1933 and returned to Ljubljana, where they stayed for 5 years and then moved to Puerto Rico. Four years later, in 1942, Kenk became a naturalized American citizen.

From 1948 to 1965, Kenk was employed at the Library of Congress. Later, he became a research associate at the Department of Invertebrate Zoology of the Smithsonian Institution, Washington, D. C., where he worked until his death in 1988.

Kenk's life was dedicated to the study of freshwater planarians, especially from Europe and the United States.

== Taxa named in his honor ==
Several taxa were named after Roman Kenk, such as the freshwater planarian genera Kenkia and Romankenkius.
