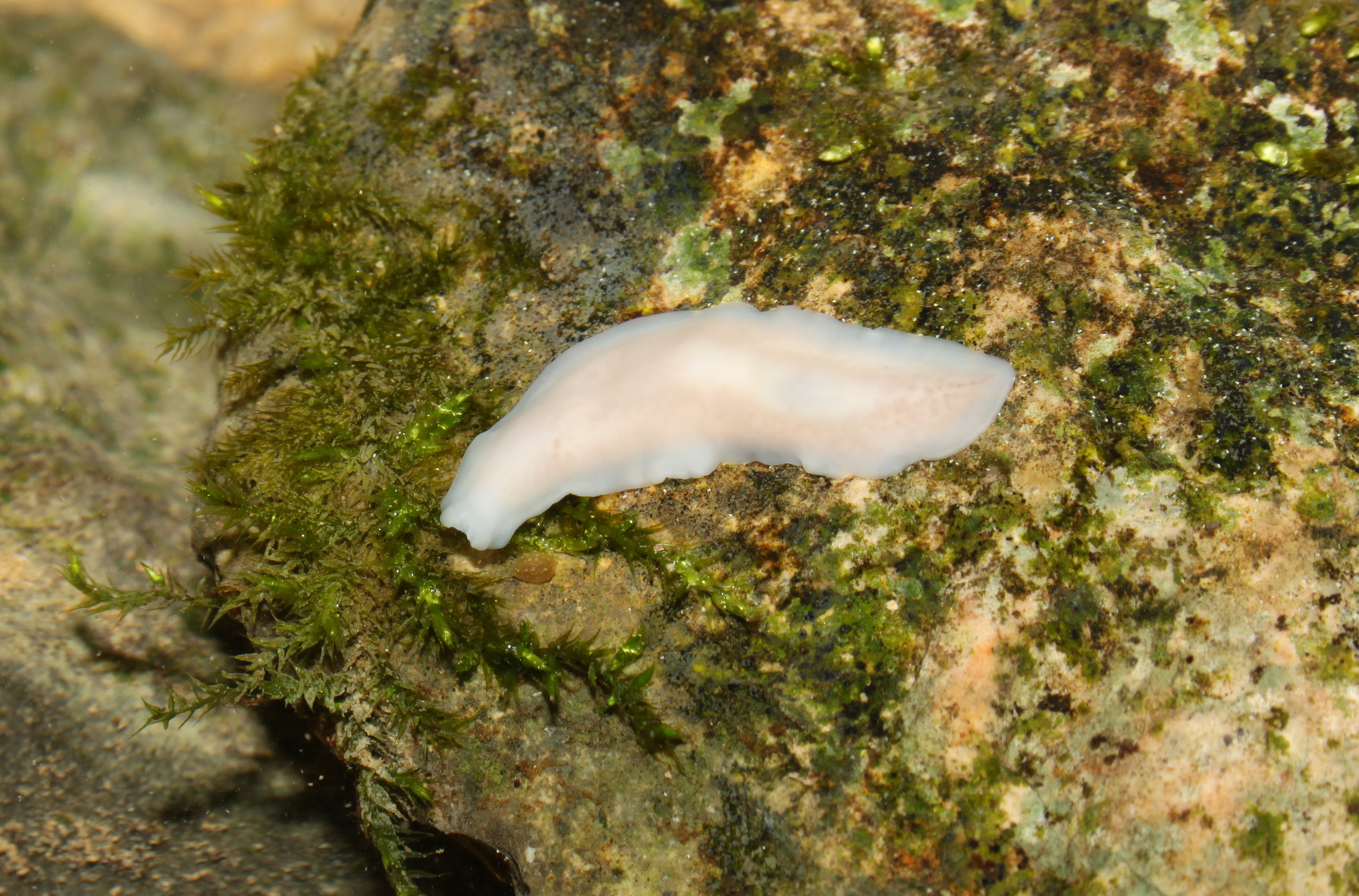
- Dendrocoelum cavaticum

Scientific classification
- Kingdom: Animalia
- Phylum: Platyhelminthes
- Order: Tricladida
- Superfamily: Planarioidea
- Family: Dendrocoelidae; Hallez, 1892

Genera
- See text

= Dendrocoelidae =

Family of flatworms

Dendrocoelidae is a family of freshwater tricladida flatworms that has a holarctic distribution.

The largest freshwater triclad known belongs to this family, it's up to 40 cm in length and inhabits the Lake Baikal.

== Description ==
The family Dendrocoelidae is characterized by an unusual arrangement of the muscle layers of the pharynx. While in most planarians the inner musculature of the pharynx is composed of two muscle layers, one circular and one longitudinal, in Dendrocoelidae the circular and longitudinal fibers are intermingled, forming a mixed layer.

Dendrocoelidae is the sister group of Kenkiidae. Both families have an anterior adhesive organ, which is considered a synapomorphy of the group.

== Genera ==
The following genera are recognised in the family Dendrocoelidae:

- Genus Acromyadenium de Beauchamp, 1931
- Genus Alaoplana Kenk, 1974
- Genus Amyadenium de Beauchamp, 1931
- Genus Anocelis Stimpson, 1857
- Genus Archicotylus Korotneff, 1912
- Genus Armilla Livanov, 1961
- Genus Atria Porfirieva, 1970
- Genus Baikalobia Kenk, 1930
- Genus Baikalocotylus Porfirieva, 1977
- Genus Baikaloplana Berg, 1925
- Genus Bdellocephala de Man, 1875
- Genus Caspioplana Zabusova, 1951
- Genus Dendrocoelopsis Kenk, 1930
- Genus Dendrocoelum Ørsted, 1844
- Genus Hyperbulbina Livanov & Porfirjeva, 1962
- Genus Hyperpapillina Porfirieva, 1973
- Genus Microarchicotylus Porfiriev & Timoshkin, 2015
- Genus Miodendrocoelum de Beauchamp, 1929
- Genus Papilloplana Kenk, 1974
- Genus Polycladodes Steinmann, 1910
- Genus Procotyla Leidy, 1857
- Genus Protocotylus Korotneff, 1908
- Genus Rimacephalus Sabussov, 1901
- Genus Sorocelis Grube, 1872

== Phylogeny ==
Phylogenetic supertree after Sluys et al., 2009:

- Tricladida
  - Maricola
  - - Cavernicola
    - Continenticola
      - Planarioidea
        - Planariidae
        - - Kenkiidae
          - Dendrocoelidae
      - Geoplanoidea
        - Dugesiidae
        - Geoplanidae
