= Girardia (disambiguation) =

Girardia can refer to two different genera of living organisms:

- Girardia (alga), a genus of red algae in the family Bangiaceae
- Girardia, a genus of freshwater triclad worm in the family Dugesiidae
