= List of Ouran High School Host Club chapters =

The cover of the first volume of the Ouran High School Host Club manga released by Hakusensha on August 5, 2003.

Ouran High School Host Club is a Japanese manga series written and illustrated by Bisco Hatori. The series follows Haruhi Fujioka, a scholarship student to the exclusive Ouran High School, and, through an accident, is forced to join the school's host club.

The manga is serialized monthly in Hakusensha's magazine LaLa running from August 5, 2003, and to September 24, 2010. The untitled chapters have been collected in eighteen tankōbon volumes in Japan. An English adaption of the series is also published in North America by Viz Media under their Shojo Beat label and in Singapore by Chuang Yi with the title Ouran High Host Club; the Singapore edition is imported under license to Australia and New Zealand by Madman Entertainment. The series is also published in Singapore in simplified Chinese by Chuang Yi, in Indonesia by Elex Media Komputindo, in South Korea by Haksanpub, in France by Panini Comics under the Génération Comics imprint, in Germany by Carlsen Comics, and in Brazil and Mexico by Panini Comics.

== List of volumes ==
No.	Original release date	Original ISBN	English (North America / Singapore) release date	English (North America / Singapore) ISBN
1	August 5, 2003	978-4-592-17448-6	July 5, 2005 (NA); August 11, 2006 (SG)	978-1-59116-915-4 (NA); ISBN 981-260-617-3 (SG)
Chapters 1–3; Extra Episode: Honey's Bun-Bun
While searching for a quiet place to study, androgynous scholarship student Haruhi Fujioka tries Ouran High School's third music room and discovers it is being used by the school's Host Club, headed by Tamaki Suou. When Haruhi accidentally breaks an expensive vase that was going for auction at the school for $80,000, she is forced to become a member to work off the debt, and only after she has worked for them for a while does Tamaki discover that Haruhi is a girl. Despite this, she is a natural at hosting other girls, so she is forced to continue pretending she is a boy. When the Host Club learns that one of their regular customers is having trouble with her fiancé, they cook up a plan to help involving using Haruhi dressed as a girl to find out the true feelings of the fiancé. At the Host Club's Christmas party, a kiss with a club member is auctioned off, but when vice-president Kyouya Ootori declares that Haruhi is the kisser, a distressed Tamaki tries to stop it—but instead accidentally pushes Haruhi into kissing the winning girl on the lips. A French otaku (fangirl), Renge, who is infatuated with Kyouya, appoints herself manager of the Host Club and tries to retool their hosting personas. Kyouya insists that they go along for family business reasons, but when her meddling cuts into the club's profits, he stops it.
2	November 5, 2003	978-4-592-17449-3	September 26, 2005 (NA); August 11, 2006 (SG)	978-1-59116-990-1 (NA); ISBN 981-260-713-7 (SG)
Chapters 4–7; Love Egoist story 1: "Romantic Egoist"
During the school's physical examinations, the Host Club tries to protect Haruhi's secret. At first Tamaki tries to impersonate her, but when that fails, Kyouya uses his influence as the heir to the company that holds Ouran's health services contract to keep the doctor from revealing it. When Haruhi comments on the differences between the Hitachiin twins, Hikaru and Kaoru, this triggers a quarrel between the siblings that causes more and more trouble for the Host Club until Haruhi realizes they are simply bored. An elementary-school boy seeks Tamaki's help at winning the hearts of women, but does not get very far until the Host Club realizes that what he really wants is help winning the heart of a specific girl, a classmate who is about to move away. The Host Club drags Haruhi out to relax at an artificial tropical beach, where an accident separates Hunny from the rest of the gang. After several misadventures, including an encounter with security guards, the club realizes Kyouya has been using them to beta test the safety of a new family enterprise.
3	March 5, 2004	978-4-592-18081-4	November 1, 2005 (NA); February 10, 2007 (SG)	978-1-4215-0062-1 (NA); ISBN 981-260-938-5 (SG)
Chapters 8–12; Extra Episode: Daily Life in the Fujioka Family
The Host Club honors Haruhi's offhand comment while at the artificial beach and takes her (and some of their customers) to a real beach. While there, the boys start a competition to find the seemingly unflappable Haruhi's "weakness." When Haruhi attempts to protect some guests from local thugs, she gets thrown into the sea by one of the attackers. Tamaki rescues her but berates her for thinking she could take on two boys. Haruhi defends her actions, after which they refuse to speak to each other. That evening, while staying in the beachside mansion of Nekozawa, head of the Black Magic Club, the twins along with Mori and Hunny, get Haruhi to realize that Tamaki and the others had been worried for her safety. Haruhi begins to understand, then feels nauseous from eating too much. She's rushed to the nearest bathroom, which turns out to be in Kyouya's bedroom. He "plays the villain" on Haruhi by reminding her that she can pay him back for the flowers with her body. Soon after, Kyouya is overlying Haruhi on Kyouya's bed, but lets her go when Haruhi unmasks his plot to frighten her. When a storm begins, Tamaki discovers that Haruhi is afraid of thunder. St. Lobelia Girl's Academy's Zuka Club meet Haruhi and, recognizing she is a girl, try to convince her to transfer to their school. Worried that she might agree, the boys put on their own version of the Takarazuka Revue, before finding out she had no intention of leaving. At Halloween, a supposed school curse starts affecting Haruhi but she eventually realizes that it is a holiday trick of the Hatachiin twins. Interested in the unknown ways of a "commoner's lifestyle," the Host Club visits Haruhi's apartment. As the others leave to go on a supermarket shopping trip, Tamaki trips and lands on Haruhi, just before her father, Ranka, comes home to see a strange boy on the floor on top of his daughter.
4	August 5, 2004	978-4-592-18082-1	January 3, 2006 (NA); February 10, 2007 (SG)	978-1-4215-0192-5 (NA); ISBN 981-269-025-5 (SG)
Chapters 13–16; Love Egoist story 2: "Love Egoist"; Extra Episode: Ouran Suspense Theater
Ranka is not initially impressed by Tamaki, and while he warms to the rest of the Host Club while shopping at the supermarket, he remains suspicious of their leader. Ranka's incessant bullying of the club king is because of his fear that one day Haruhi will choose Tamaki over him. When Hunny gets a cavity, Mori forces him to avoid sweets until he agrees to get it filled. In an off-continuity story, Alice in Wonderland is retold with characters played by members of the Host Club. The Newspaper Club wants an interview with the popular Host Club in order, they claim, to save it from being disbanded due to a lack of readers. The Host Club members realize, however, that they are actually seeking dirt and frustrate their plans.
5	January 5, 2005	978-4-592-18083-8	March 7, 2006 (NA); March 14, 2007 (SG)	978-1-4215-0329-5 (NA); ISBN 981-269-052-2 (SG)
Chapters 17–21; Extra Episode: Mori's Secret
When Haruhi fails to score at the top of her class on exams, her scholarship is in jeopardy. Kyouya recruits the third-place second-year student, Ayame Jōnōchi, to be her tutor, but their sessions are strained. Eventually, Haruhi realizes Ayame is both jealous of Tamaki's higher class rank, despite the fact he's not trying, and infatuated with him. During summer vacation, Haruhi gets a job in a pension run by one of her father's cross-dressing friends, Misuzu. When the rest of the Host Club visits, Misuzu holds a contest to have the most "refreshing" boy stay in the one remaining room, which is won by the Hitachiin brothers. When Haruhi meets an old friend from middle school, Hikaru becomes jealous of him and has an argument with Haruhi. Kaoru sets Hikaru up on a date with Haruhi to help the two make up, but when Haruhi gets caught alone in a thunderstorm and Hikaru is reluctant to go after her, Tamaki finally lets out the secret that Haruhi is afraid of thunder to get him to move. Back in school, Tamaki decides to train Nekozawa to be the princely figure his little sister thinks he is, with the result that she joins him "in darkness."
6	July 5, 2005	978-4-592-18084-5	May 2, 2006 (NA); March 14, 2007 (SG)	978-1-4215-0584-8 (NA); ISBN 981-269-053-0 (SG)
Chapters 22–27
The American Football Club challenges the Host Club for the right to use the high-profile Central Salon during the school cultural festival. At the same time, the Host Club receives threatening anonymous notes and Kyouya puts Haruhi and Tamaki in charge of finding the culprit. As the contest between the two clubs begins, a flashback shows the origin of the animosity of Takeshi Kuze, captain of the American Football Club, towards Kyouya in a childhood squabble. During the contest, a race through the school, Haruhi realizes that the threats came from two different sources, one of them being Kuze's fiancee, and helps Tamaki win the contest. The other notes are revealed to be from Tamaki's father, the chairman of the school board, who enjoys teasing his son. During the cultural festival, Haruhi meets the families of other Host Club members, including Tamaki's father. However, after seeing his grandmother snub him, she learns Tamaki is the son of his father's French mistress, which changes her attitude towards him. After the festival, when the school's senior most teacher remembers the excellent taste of a soup he once had in his youth, Tamaki and the Host Club launch a search for the soup's recipe, with the prize being Haruhi's homemade food ("a hot blooded battle of men").
7	December 5, 2005	978-4-592-18085-2	September 5, 2006 (NA); April 4, 2007 (SG)	978-1-4215-0864-1 (NA); ISBN 981-269-108-1 (SG)
Chapters 28–31; Extra Episode: "Hitachiin Family Background"; Love Egoist story 3: "Please Please Me"
The boys of the Host Club drag Kyouya to a commoner's department store to understand more about Haruhi by studying the lives of ordinary people. Kyouya meets Haruhi there alone, and they compare how they each view their lives. Yasuchika has a grudge against his older brother Hunny, and the rest of the Host Club wants to know why. On the other hand, Mori's younger brother, Satoshi, shows himself to be the complete opposite of the stoic Club member. Chika challenges Hunny to a karate re-match, which he loses. The girls from St. Lobelia's Zuka Club manage to make Haruhi visit their academy, and the Host Club boys and her father follow to try to save her. In the end, they learn it was an exercise to show the younger Zuka Club members what boys will do, so they can act the part better.
8	April 5, 2006	978-4-592-18086-9	January 2, 2007 (NA); May 2, 2007 (SG)	978-1-4215-1161-0 (NA); ISBN 981-269-231-2 (SG)
Chapters 32–36; Extra Episode: Seizaburo Tachibana, Ohtori Staff Member
For classroom bonding, the twins suggests by having a kimodameshi (test of courage). While the twins, Haruhi, and the class representative set things up, Nekozawa and his Black Magic Club pull a prank that results in the twins being separated. Kyouya recalls, in a flashback, his first meeting with Tamaki, two years before. He initially puts up with Tamaki's odd requests but eventually snaps, after which they become good friends. When the son of a gangster, Ritsu Kasanoda, asks Mori how he can change his scary image and gain friends, the Host Club jumps at the opportunity to give him "reformative" training to change his personality. Kasanoda accidentally discovers Haruhi's secret, after which he becomes a regular customer, asking for her as his host even though she is still pretending to be male.
9	September 5, 2006	978-4-592-18087-6	July 3, 2007 (NA); June 6, 2007 (SG)	978-1-4215-1404-8 (NA); ISBN 981-269-536-2 (SG)
Chapters 37–40; Extra Episode: The Host Club's Operation for Modest Happiness; Love Egoist 4: "Love or Dream?"
In a flashback, Tamaki recruits the twins to help form the Host Club. A foreign princess arrives at Ouran High as an exchange student in Class 1-A, as classmates of Haruhi and the twins. Her arrogance and unreasonable demands get the twins especially worked up; but knowing that the princess was merely putting on an act, Tamaki sets out to put things right. However, doing so forces him to confront his own feelings about Haruhi. As he broods over his troubles, Tamaki comes down with a cold, and the Host Club visits him at home, during which Tamaki has an urge to kiss Haruhi. After his father tells him it's normal to want to kiss your child, Tamaki kisses her on the forehead the next time he sees her.
10	April 5, 2007	978-4-592-18088-3	February 5, 2008 (NA); August 14, 2007 (SG)	978-1-4215-1929-6 (NA); ISBN 981-269-959-7 (SG)
Chapters 41–46
Reiko Kanazuki from the Black Magic Club tries to use magic to get Hunny's affections. Misuzu asks Haruhi and her father for help with his daughter, Mei, who despises her father's crossdressing. When the Host Club follows Haruhi after she skips school to help Mei, they all end up in a karaoke place together. Mei develops a crush on Tamaki and asks for Haruhi's help to win him. To help reconcile Mei and Misuzu, Tamaki starts secretly working at Misuzu's pension during the summer vacation, where Haruhi joins him. When the Hitachiin twins find out, Hikaru is not happy and they visit the pension, where they discover Haruhi is working Tamaki to the bone. At a summer festival, Mei is finally alone with Tamaki and she asks him whether he loves Haruhi. Tamaki tells her only as a father, and Mei thinks he's an idiot for not realising his true feelings. When Haruhi and Mei visit the twins' mansion, Haruhi is forced into participating in a fashion show by the twins and their mother. She escapes and is rescued by the twins' father, and he talks with her about his sons, and Kaoru overhears. Back in school, Tamaki meddles with the American Football Club, escalating into a fight with Kyouya. It eventually expands into a school-wide athletic festival. Kyouya is captain of the white Team, joined by Kaoru and Hunny, while Tamaki leads the red Team with Haruhi, Hikaru and Mori.
11	September 5, 2007	978-4-592-18089-0	November 4, 2008 (NA); February 25, 2008 (SG)	1-4215-2255-1 (NA); ISBN 978-981-276-263-4 (SG)
Chapters 47–51; Bonus story: Chika-chan and Mori's pet chick, Piyo-chan
The red and white teams plan their strategies as the competition grows closer. Once it begins, the white Team holds the lead. During the second half, however, the red Team catches up and the competition comes to be decided by the final event: a relay in which Kyouya and Tamaki go head-to-head. Kyouya narrowly wins the race and the two reconcile. Shortly after the sports festival, Mori helps a distressed tanuki. Hikaru is confused as to why he is so bothered when Haruhi thinks about Tamaki, until Kaoru explains it is because he is in love with her. As Hikaru thinks about this, he realizes Kaoru also likes Haruhi. Kaoru tells Hikaru that if he is not serious about his feelings towards Haruhi, he will never let Hikaru have her.
12	April 5, 2008	978-4-592-18090-6	June 2, 2009 (NA); July 22, 2008 (SG)	1-4215-2672-7 (NA); ISBN 978-981-276-575-8 (SG)
Chapters 52–56; Senior Kuze's Unfortunate Yet Happy Days
Kaoru takes Haruhi on a date to an amusement park and asks Hunny and Mori to take Hikaru to the same amusement park to make Hikaru jealous. Kaoru tells Haruhi that he loves her, and kisses her cheek, but says that Hikaru is still more important to him. Haruhi does not understand that Kaoru loves her. Later, as Hikaru and Kaoru talk about their feelings for Haruhi, Hikaru realizes that Kaoru has done everything for him and tells him they can still stay together. They decide to become two different people, and shortly afterward, Hikaru dyes his hair. While in France on a class trip, Kyouya searches for Tamaki's mother. Tamaki, on the other hand, stays in Japan while letting the others believe he has gone. Haruhi eventually finds Tamaki sneaking around her house just as Kyouya calls to tell her Tamaki is with him, but has fallen sick. In France, Kyouya learns the location of Tamaki's mother. Meanwhile, Tamaki tells Haruhi about his past and his doubts about being in the Suou family. As he leaves, Tamaki kisses Haruhi on the forehead, causing her to blush. Back in France, Kyouya meets Tamaki's mother and learns about her past. He returns to Japan, soon afterward. Tamaki apologizes to the Host Club for lying about being in France. Kyouya mentions that he met a woman in France, eventually making Tamaki cry. Later that night, Haruhi feels weird but she believes that she just has a cold.
13	September 5, 2008	978-4-592-18713-4	November 3, 2009 (NA); December 16, 2008 (SG)	978-1-4215-2673-7 (NA); ISBN 978-981-276-717-2 (SG)
Chapters 57–61; The First Day
During the next Host Club meeting, Haruhi is still feeling "sick" and blushes when she is near Tamaki. Because Hikaru becomes angry when Tamaki and Haruhi are together, the twins devise a plan to help him deal with his feelings. Haruhi tells her problems to Mei. Before Mei can offer advice, Kaoru calls. Mei abruptly leaves, "accidentally" forgetting a magazine. The next day, Haruhi stays home sick, denying what she read in the magazine: that she loves Tamaki. Haruhi skips school, still insisting that the magazine is wrong. She meets Kousaka and Tamaki in the park and faints. Tamaki takes care of her at home, and when she wakes up she thanks him for all he has done for her. She also realizes her feelings for Tamaki. The next day, she agrees to go on her class skiing trip. Kasanoda brings the Host Club an old treasure map. Without Tamaki, the rest of the club decides to look for the treasure—and when Tamaki appears, Haruhi blushes. They finally find the treasure but it is an empty box. Meanwhile, Hikaru, Kaoru and Haruhi accidentally find an unknown hot spring. As Tamaki and Hikaru are putting away the shovels, Hikaru accidentally tells Tamaki he loves Haruhi. Haruhi, Kaoru and Hikaru go on a class ski trip, during which Hikaru regrets what he said to Tamaki. Hikaru ends up sharing a room with Haruhi. Meanwhile, back home, Tamaki has a dream of his past. Kyoya, Mori and Hunny worry about him and go without him to the ski lodge. Kyouya, Mori, Hunny and Kaoru conclude that Tamaki may never act on his true feelings for Haruhi, a conversation that Hikaru overhears. Hikaru ponders what he overheard, and cannot sleep that night. The next day he, Kaoru, Haruhi and the class president climb a mountain where they are caught in a storm. Kaoru and Haruhi return to the lodge while Hikaru and the class president (who was dragged to the top of the mountain by Hikaru) wait for the rescue team. Hikaru faints after being rescued and wakes up to find Kaoru and Haruhi in his room. After Kaoru leaves, Hikaru confesses to Haruhi and asks her to be his girlfriend. Meanwhile, after hearing about Hikaru's rescue, Tamaki is coming to the lodge.
14	May 1, 2009	978-4-592-18714-1	July 6, 2010 (NA); July 21, 2009 (SG)	978-1-4215-3565-4 (NA); ISBN 978-981-276-876-6 (SG)
Chapters 62–66
62: Hikaru asks Haruhi to think about her feelings for him rather than give an answer straight away. He invites her to the Year End party and leaves. Haruhi is left surprised by his confession. Hikaru runs into the rest of the Host Club, including Tamaki who is relieved to see he is okay. Hikaru tells Tamaki that he confessed to Haruhi and hasn't got a reply, but he is going to fight for her. He tells Tamaki that he should also do his best and not give into his 'traumas'. Tamaki wonders what Hikaru means, and what Haruhi will reply to him. He wants the Host Club to stay a family forever. Later at the party, Haruhi tells Mei she was dense not to realise Hikaru's feelings and goes outside to speak to Hikaru privately. Outside, Haruhi tells Hikaru that she doesn't feel the same, but he's an important friend to her and hopes that won't change. Hikaru asks if she likes Tamaki. An embarrassed Haruhi admits she respects Tamaki, but says he's also annoying. Hikaru teases that he still has a chance with her then. Later on, Hikaru tells Tamaki that Haruhi rejected him. The Club make plans to visit a shrine together in the New Year, and Hikaru invites Haruhi to let her know they can still be friends. 63: Tamaki dreams of his father, who is kept apart from Tamaki and his mother. His father reassures him that family bonds can't be broken by distance. Tamaki wakes up and mentions that he wasn't invited to the New Year party at the main residence again and so it's unlikely that he will succeed his Grandmother, who is chairman of the Suoh business and lives at the main residence. He realises he's late to meet the others at the Asakusa temple. On meeting up, Hikaru notices that Tamaki is distracted and challenges him to a competition to buy something that Haruhi will love the most. They split up, but later on Tamaki runs into Haruhi. Tamaki mentions Hikaru, and Haruhi confesses that she hates herself for not realising his feelings sooner and questions how she can succeed as a lawyer if she's so dense. Tamaki reassures her and tells her to be more confident. He gives her an Ootoro Ring, which he bought earlier as part of Hikaru's challenge, which cheers her up. Seeing her happiness, Tamaki wonders what kind of love he feels for Haruhi and absent-mindedly touches her face - embarrassing them both. Tamaki explains to Haruhi that he's not really her father, and Haruhi calls him an idiot and says she never thought of him like a father. Embarrassed, she runs away and Tamaki chases after her. He finds her Ootoro Ring on the ground, but Haruhi has disappeared. 64: The Host Club realise that Haruhi has been kidnapped. They trace her mobile phone to find her location, and Kyoya works out that the kidnappers are people having business problems with the Suohs. Tamaki, Hikaru, Hunny and Mori reach the location and find Haruhi unharmed. Tamaki embraces her in relief. Hikaru makes sure to break up the embrace and express his concern too. Tamaki tells off the kidnappers, but also says he'll help them with their problems. Haruhi wants to return to Asakusa, and Tamaki realises it's because of the Ootoro Ring that she dropped and returns it to her. Hikaru gets a little jealous seeing how happy it makes her. Kousaka, the Suoh's lawyer who was loitering around the whole day, makes a call to Tamaki's grandmother and wants to discuss the issue of Tamaki moving into the main residence. 65: The Host Club are hosting a horse riding day. Tamaki has been acting distracted, and Hikaru wonders if Tamaki has realised his feelings for Haruhi yet. A new girl called Kanoya get into trouble with the horses and Tamaki protects her, but ends up hurt. Kanoya is grateful to Tamaki and thanks him by making him lunch, whilst he offers to show her around Tokyo. The others comment on how much Kanoya looks like Haruhi, except her personality is submissive instead. Tamaki and Kanoya start spending more time together. Kyouya reveals Kanoya has family problems like Tamaki and Hikaru comments that she is perfect for Tamaki and they have much in common - Tamaki overhears this. Later, Tamaki is with Kanoya when Haruhi walks by, dropping a book. Tamaki picks it up for her and comments on how different she is to him. Haruhi takes it as an insult and leaves, forgetting one of her books. Tamaki tries to return it to her, but Kanoya stops him by confessing her love to him. 66: The others are spying on Tamaki and Kanoya, and wondering what their relationship is. Hikaru tells Haruhi about the rumour Kanoya confessed to Tamaki . Haruhi wonders what his answer was, but Tamaki catches them spying before they can talk about it more. They join them for lunch, and Kanoya speaks to Tamaki in familiar terms, raising more questions about their relationship. Kyouya tells Tamaki to come with him to the clubroom and they leave. Kanoya reveals she feels good around Tamaki, and Haruhi wonders whether Tamaki likes Kanoya and knows that she's very different from herself. In the clubroom, Tamaki admits to Kyouya that he declined Kanoya, but realises that she is just like him. He thinks about his past and his longing for strong family bonds as a child. He reaffirms to himself in the present that he doesn't want to let go of his 'family' idea. The bell rings for class, and Kanoya goes to find Tamaki whilst Haruhi is told about her family problems. Whilst Tamaki is away, the Host Club decide they need a plan regarding Tamaki and Kanoya.
15	September 4, 2009	978-4-592-18715-8	December 7, 2010 (NA)	978-1-4215-3670-5 (NA)
Chapters 67–71
67: The Host Club are holding an orienteering competition and Haruhi convinces Tamaki to enter with Kanoya. At 4 locations the participants have to complete a challenge and then choose from a selection of ingredients for the 5th challenge - to cook a curry. Tamaki chooses terrible ingredients, but Kanoya is too submissive to tell him he's wrong. During the challenge Tamaki realises that, although Kanoya is more suited to him and even resembles Haruhi, she has a very different personality and it's really Haruhi that he loves. 68: Tamaki reminisces on how stupidly he has acted towards Haruhi, particularly his insistence on treating her like a daughter. He remembers how his father's actions to choose love broke up his family and he's scared that he will do the same to his Host Club family. This reminds him of how Hikaru said that their bond won't be easily broken. Mori later also tells him to be honest with himself and know that everyone in the Host Club trusts him. At the curry challenge, Kanoya has a difficult task to make a curry out of terrible ingredients, but as a cook's daughter she gets back her confidence and does well. In the final 'truth' challenge Kanoya admits that she misses her dad and Haruhi encourages her to be honest with her family about her feelings. Haruhi also tells off Tamaki for keeping secrets from the Host Club and lets him know that they all want to support him – whatever it is. Tamaki realises that, despite being scared of losing his friends, he is ready to tell Haruhi how he feels. 69: In a flashback, Tamaki tells Hikaru that he also loves Haruhi. Walking to school, Haruhi is still wondering what Tamaki's secret is when he arrives on a Segway. He tries to confess but starts babbling nervously and makes Haruhi run away. Tamaki is full of self-confidence and thinks it's a sign she loves him. Hikaru tells Tamaki not to presume that he knows her feelings, but Tamaki doesn't listen. Meanwhile, Kanoya tells Haruhi that she was depending on Tamaki too much, and probably just liked him as a father figure. Haruhi disagrees because seeing them together made her jealous. Haruhi goes to the clubroom wondering what she sees in Tamaki – only to find him singing 'Happy Birthday' to himself like a fool. Tamaki's confidence evaporates on seeing Haruhi and he hides and starts to wonder whether he is right to assume she likes him. It is revealed that it's Haruhi's birthday next week and Tamaki and Hikaru both imagine buying her a present that will make her fall in love with them. Kyouya gets a phone call and reveals he knows something about the "lying lawyer" Kousaka. 70: Kyouya has found out that Kousaka has been secretly and regularly meeting with Tamaki's grandmother, and also has a link to Haruhi's family. Kousaka visits Haruhi's dad and it's revealed that she was classmates with Haruhi's mother. She warns Ranka that Haruhi should stay away from the Suoh family and Ouran. Meanwhile, Tamaki and Hikaru are trying to work out the perfect birthday present for Haruhi – finally agreeing that she'd like something low-cost and useful since she's a commoner. They end up both giving her the same thing - a Prawn Rice Water Flowing kit - but Haruhi prefers the Shiitake Mushroom kit from Ritsu. 71: It's the last day before Mori and Hunny graduate from Ouran, and the club are shocked to find out that they won't be together at university as Mori is pursuing Law and Hunny pursuing Science and Technology. Haruhi finds Tamaki asleep in the clubroom and reflects on how badly she's treated him over the last few days and how hard he is taking the departure of Mori and Hunny. It's clear that something is on Mori's mind, and the Host Club think he's sad to be leaving Hunny's side. Hunny demands Mori tell him what's bothering him, and Mori says he will – after they duel.
16	April 5, 2010	978-4-592-18716-5	June 7, 2011 (NA)	978-1-421-53870-9 (NA)
Chapters 72–75
72: Mori and Hunny fight, and Mori eventually wins by picking Hunny up and placing him out of bounds. Mori tells Hunny what's on his mind – that he doesn't want him to bring his soft toy with him to university as he's an adult now. The twins are shocked that this is all that was bothering Mori, but Hunny explains that they've known that they would have to go their separate ways eventually and would always remember the fun they had in the Host Club. Hunny and Mori graduate, but Hunny says they'll come back and visit – cheering Tamaki up. Tamaki wants to tell Haruhi the good news, and literally runs into her. They share an accidental kiss and both rush off a bit shaken by the moment. Meanwhile, Tamaki's grandmother declares that Tamaki will enter the main house and end the Host Club in the new school year. 73: Tamaki is still excited by the accidental kiss but doubts whether it meant anything to Haruhi. He is interrupted by someone that has come to see him from the main house. The lawyer Kousaka reveals she has convinced Tamaki's grandmother to let Tamaki enter the main house, and is hoping she'll get a big monetary reward from Tamaki's father. Tamaki visits Haruhi to tell her he's moving into the main house and so will be busy all holidays, but hopes to see her in the new school year. Haruhi is really happy for Tamaki. Kyouya also hears the news but has a bad feeling about it. Tamaki's grandmother says she'll be strictly supervising Tamaki. 74: Tamaki is told that he can't see his staff and pet dog from the 2nd house anymore. He'll also be expected to study all holidays. Tamaki's father greets him, and Tamaki begs to see his staff and dog, but he is told to obey his grandmother. Tamaki has to eat dinner alone, but resolves to make the best of his new situation because he'll still be able to see his friends in the new school year. School restarts, and Haruhi discovers that Tamaki can't join the Host Club as he has to study after school, his grandmother is ignoring him, and the staff at the main residence have been told not to speak to him. Tamaki remains optimistic that he'll be able to win over his grandmother and rejoin the Host Club, but admits he's lonely and wants to have lunch with everyone. Unfortunately, with the Host Club suspended, all the Host Club guests also want time with Tamaki and he gets taken away. Separately, Haruhi and Tamaki are both longing to speak to each other again. The chapter ends with Tamaki confirming to his grandmother that he'll leave the Host Club as she wishes. 75: Tamaki announces he's quitting the Host Club and tells Haruhi that she should also quit because he will pay off her remaining debt. Haruhi is furious and asks Tamaki to explain, but Tamaki tells her it's none of her business and leaves. Kyouya follows and finds Tamaki upset. Tamaki explains that his grandmother accused him of ruining Haruhi's life by forcing her into the Club and making her lie about her gender, and he has damaged the Suoh reputation by associating with a person from a lower social standing. He agrees to leave the Host Club when she threatens to get Haruhi expelled from Ouran. Kyouya thinks his grandmother will still target Haruhi despite Tamaki's actions. Haruhi goes to demand answers from Tamaki's grandmother, but Tamaki and Kyoya find out and interrupt her. Tamaki tells her to go back to school and stop causing trouble. Haruhi is shocked by his words and remembers back to when Tamaki said he would take care of her. The Host Club gets permanently suspended from Ouran by Tamaki's father.
17	September 3, 2010	978-4-592-18717-2	December 6, 2011 (NA)	978-1-421-53979-9 (NA)
Chapters 76–79
76: Tamaki tells his grandmother that he has quit the Host Club and she is pleased. The Host Club are angry and don't understand why Tamaki is going along with it. Haruhi runs into Kousaka, and Kousaka thinks Tamaki lives in a different world and has chosen family over the Host Club. Haruhi doesn't believe Tamaki would ever betray the Club and thinks something else must be going on. She decides to return to school dressed shabbily. She tells Tamaki that she knows he wants to bond with his grandmother and has returned to how she used to be before joining the Host Club so that he can do so without worrying about her. Tamaki smiles and moves away, and we're told the Host Club officially disbands. 77: Tamaki is trying to bond with his grandmother at the main house. At school, Haruhi and Tamaki no longer speak and she is continuing to dress shabby. She tells Mei that she'll continue until Tamaki reconciles with his family. Kyouya calls a meeting and tells everyone that Tamaki's mum has SLE syndrome, but thinks she may be taking an experimental drug to get better. They later discover that Kyouya's family have made a valuable deal with a company led by Tamaki's father to exclusively sell the drug, which will give Tamaki's father a chance to gain independence from Tamaki's grandmother. Unfortunately this deal shatters Tamaki's dream of having a happy family. 78: Side story about the Hitachiin family. 79: Haruhi dreams of confessing to Tamaki. Hikaru also encourages her to confess to try and cure Tamaki's depression. Kyoya tells the Host Club that Tamaki's mother is in Japan and the twins hope Tamaki will see her and cheer up. Tamaki, however, is refusing to see his mother unless his grandmother approves. He is also refusing to see the Host Club and not attending school. At school, many of the Ouran students offer to help the Host Club to help Tamaki, and Haruhi reflects on how many bonds Tamaki has formed since coming to Japan alone. At the main house, Tamaki is bonding with his grandmother and she compliments his knowledge of the things she likes. He tells her he learnt it all from his father, and he must have been trying to share her loves with Tamaki, which surprises her. Haruhi finds out that Tamaki's mother will be leaving Japan tomorrow and the Host Club pledge to reunite Tamaki and his mother before she leaves.
18	April 5, 2011	978-4-592-18718-9	June 5, 2012 (NA)	978-1-421-54135-8 (NA)
Chapters 80–83
80: The Host Club have devised a plan to reunite Tamaki with his mother. With Mori's help, Haruhi breaks through a window in the main house and comes face to face with Tamaki and his grandmother. Tamaki admits he knows his mother is leaving Tokyo, but refuses to see her as he already has plans with his grandmother. Haruhi gets angry and asks him not to put aside his own feelings for the sake of his family. Tamaki still refuses, but his grandmother – who now seems to think more favourably about Tamaki - gives her blessing for him to go. With the help of several of Tamaki's friends from the Host Club and school, he is able to reach the airport on time and reunite with his mother. Haruhi finally tells Tamaki that she loves him. 81: Still at the airport, Tamaki is in pieces over Haruhi's confession and Haruhi starts to have second thoughts – finally giving Tamaki the courage to kiss her and convince her of his feelings. Tamaki's father and grandmother decide to take Haruhi's advice and speak honestly to each other to reconcile their differences. Back at school, Tamaki returns and the Host Club reopens. The twins don't think Haruhi and Tamaki have been acting like a couple, and we discover this is because Tamaki has been too busy trying to plan their first date. Meanwhile, Haruhi meets up with Kousaka to get some career advice. Later on Tamaki and Haruhi meet up and Haruhi asks Tamaki to go to the Amusement Park with her before he has the chance to ask her out on his carefully planned 'perfect date'. Haruhi finds his 'perfect date' notes, and finds it funny. She reassures him that she could never be bored as long as she's spending time with him. Tamaki tells Haruhi he loves her and she gets really flustered by his cuddles and loving stares. 82: Tamaki and Haruhi meet for their first date. Tamaki typically goes overboard, but the rest of the Host Club try to fix all his mistakes before Haruhi notices and dumps him. They also intervene when the Zuka club see Haruhi and try to steal her away. Tamaki and Haruhi escape and Tamaki takes her to visit her mother's grave so that he can pay his respects. Tamaki admits that he knows Haruhi has been offered a one-year scholarship in the United States, as she is one of Ouran's best students, and he agrees it will be a good experience for her. After hearing Tamaki's supportive words, Haruhi is convinced her decision to accept the offer is the right one - even though it means leaving a lot behind. 83: The Host Club arrange a farewell party for Haruhi. At the party, Haruhi is surprised that Tamaki isn't paying her much attention considering tonight is their last together, but before she can think about it too much she is whisked away and given a make-over so that she can reveal the truth about her gender to everyone. She enters dressed as a girl – but everyone says they already knew Haruhi's secret. Tamaki and Haruhi dance together as a public couple. Later, Haruhi and Tamaki talk alone and Haruhi says she's sad to be leaving. When Tamaki shows her the plans to their new apartment, she realises that Tamaki is coming with her to the United States. Haruhi can't believe his extravagance, but Tamaki declares that he has no intention of leaving her side and they kiss. In the United States, Tamaki and Haruhi are settling into their new apartment – only to find their new neighbours are none other than the rest of the Host Club. Haruhi realises that they have no intentions of becoming memories, rather they want to stay together forever.

== See also ==
- List of Ouran High School Host Club episodes
