= Worm Runner's Digest =

Satirical (and serious) science journal (1959–1979)

The Worm Runner's Digest (W.R.D.) was created in 1959 by biologist James V. McConnell after his experiments with memory transfer in planarian worms generated a torrent of mail enquiries. The W.R.D. published both satirical articles, such as "A Stress Analysis of a Strapless Evening Gown", and scientific papers, the most famous of which, "Memory transfer through cannibalism in planarians", was a result of McConnell's RNA memory transfer experiments with planarian worms and was later published in the Journal of Neuropsychiatry.

The title for the W.R.D., McConnell explained, was an extension of the psychological jargon that terms psychologists who work with rats "rat runners" and those who work with insects "bug runners."

After complaints that the satirical articles and the scientific publications were not distinguishable, the satirical articles were printed upside down in the back half of the W.R.D. along with a topsy turvy back cover. In 1966, the title was changed to the Journal of Biological Psychology in an effort to make the publication more acceptable to the scientific community.

The magazine ceased publication in 1979. Articles from the Worm Runner's Digest have been compiled and printed in a number of anthologies, including Science, Sex, and Sacred Cows and The Worm Re-Turns.

== See also ==
- Annals of Improbable Research
