= James V. McConnell =

American psychologist and biologist (1925–1990)

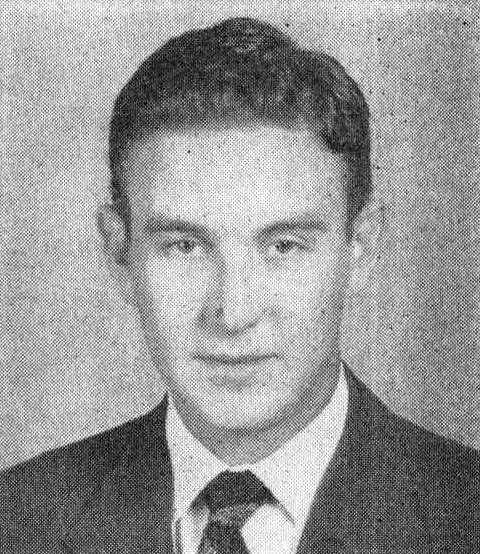
- McConnell c. 1955
- Born: October 26, 1925; Okmulgee, Oklahoma
- Died: April 9, 1990 (aged 64); Ann Arbor, Michigan
- Education: University of Texas, PhD
- Known for: Research on learning and memory transfer in planarians Targeted in bomb attack by Ted Kaczynski
- Awards: American Psychological Foundation's Gold Medal Award for Distinguished Teaching National Institute of Mental Health's Career Development Award
- Scientific career
- Fields: Biology, animal psychology
- Workplaces: University of Michigan

James V. McConnell (October 26, 1925 – April 9, 1990) was an American biologist and animal psychologist. He is most known for his research on learning and memory transfer in planarians conducted in the 1950s and 1960s. McConnell also published several short science fiction stories in the mid-1950s.

== Career ==
Most of McConnell's academic career was spent in the psychology department at the University of Michigan, where he was a professor from 1963 through his retirement in 1988. He was an unconventional scientist, setting up his own refereed journal, the Journal of Biological Psychology, which was published in tandem with the Worm Runner's Digest, a planarian-themed humor magazine. His paper Memory transfer through cannibalism in planarians, published in the Journal of Neuropsychiatry, reported that when planarians conditioned to respond to a stimulus were ground up and fed to other planarians, the recipients learned to respond to the stimulus faster than a control group did. McConnell believed that this was evidence of a chemical basis for memory, which he identified as memory RNA. Although well publicized, his findings were not completely reproducible by other scientists and were therefore at the time completely discredited (for review, see Chapouthier, 1973).

McConnell's work has been referred to by a scientist who hypothesized that McConnell's results could be explained by RNA interference (Smallheiser, 2001).

McConnell originally published satirical articles alongside serious scientific articles in the Journal of Biological Psychology but received complaints that it was difficult if not impossible to tell which was which. He decided to publish the satirical Worm Runner's Digest upside down with its cover as the back of the Journal of Biological Psychology to make it clear which articles were satire. This, he said, created problems with librarians returning the Journal to the publisher with the complaint that it was improperly bound. He was amused by this. He spent many of his evening hours in the 1960s in informal rap sessions with students in their dorms. He was prone to making provocative statements, believed that memory was chemically based and that in the future humanity would be programmed by drugs. He once commented that he would rather be "a programmer than a programmee".

McConnell, in addition to his work with planarians, wrote several works about non-planarian psychology. These include papers about autism, learning, biorhythms, and memory transfer. In addition to his papers McConnell also wrote Understanding Human Behavior, an introduction to psychology textbook. He made appearances on television to explain applications of psychology to every day Americans.

In his introduction to psychology textbook, and a later paper, McConnell writes about fellow psychologists John B. Watson and Rosalie Rayner, more specifically their sexual affair and its supposed usage to collect data on sexual arousal in humans. He suggests that this research, not just the affair with Rayner, is the reason for Watson's ousting from Johns Hopkins University.

McConnell was one of the targets of Theodore Kaczynski, known as the Unabomber. In 1985, he suffered hearing loss when a bomb, disguised as a manuscript, was opened at his house by his research assistant Nicklaus Suino.

McConnell died of a heart attack at St. Joseph's Mercy Hospital in Ann Arbor, Michigan in 1990 at age 64.

== Short fiction ==
- "Life Sentence" (Galaxy Science Fiction, January 1953)
- "All of You" (Beyond Fantasy Fiction, July 1953)
- "The Game of White" (Other Worlds Science Stories, July 1953)
- "Grandma Perkins and the Space Pirates" (Planet Stories, March 1954)
- "Phone Me in Central Park" (Planet Stories, Fall 1954)
- "Hunting License" (Imagination, April 1955)
- "Avoidance Situation" (If, February 1956) about subspace
- "Nor Dust Corrupt" (If, February 1957)
- "Learning Theory" (If, December 1957), reprinted in the anthology Modern Satiric Stories (1971)
