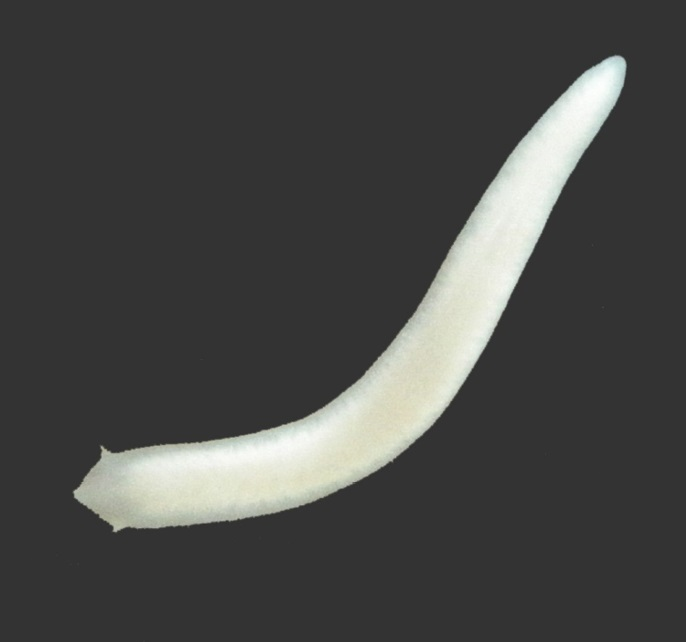

Scientific classification
- Kingdom: Animalia
- Phylum: Platyhelminthes
- Order: Tricladida
- Family: Dugesiidae
- Genus: Girardia
- Species: G. multidiverticulata

Binomial name
- Girardia multidiverticulata Souza, Morais, Cordeiro & Leal-Zanchet, 2015

= Girardia multidiverticulata =

Species of flatworm

Girardia multidiverticulata is a cave-dwelling freshwater planarian from Brazil.

== Description ==
Specimens of G. multidiverticulata are about 20 mm in length. The head is very triangular and has two small and pointed auricles. The whole animal is white, lacking pigmentation, and has no eyes, which are adaptations to its life in caves.

== Distribution ==
Girardia multidiverticulata is only known to occur in a small lake of about 10 m^{2} located inside the limestone cave Buraco do Bicho, in the Bodoquena Plateau, close to the Serra da Bodoquena National Park in the Cerrado biome, Brazil.
