= Scotophobin =

Scotophobin

Scotophobin (from Ancient Greek σκότος (skótos) 'darkness' and φόβος (phóbos) 'fear') is a peptide discovered by neuroscientist Georges Ungar in 1965 and reported in 1968. The results of Ungar and his collaborators seemed to show that scotophobin induces fear of the dark in various mammals and fish. It was discovered in the brain of laboratory rats conditioned to have a fear of darkness. Moreover, it was claimed that its injection could transfer fear to unconditioned rats. It was the core argument for the hypothesis about memory transfer: that memories are molecularly stored in the brain. Chemical memory transfer was a subject of conferences and books. According to the current knowledge, scotophobin cannot have the effect attributed to it.

The history of scotophobin is covered in the 2006 book Scotophobin: Darkness at the Dawn of the Search for Memory Molecules, a personal account of Louis Neal Irwin, who participated in this research.

== Experimental setup ==
In his main work Ungar made rats choose to enter either a lighted box or a dark box. Normally nocturnal animals, upon entering the dark, rats were given an electric shock, and the rats were quickly trained to enter the lighted box. After a prolonged training, an extract was prepared from their brains, which was injected into mice which were tested in the same lighted/dark setup. By measuring time spent by the mice in the boxes, it was found that the mice injected with an extract from the treated rats could be distinguished from the ones injected with the extract from the untreated rats.
