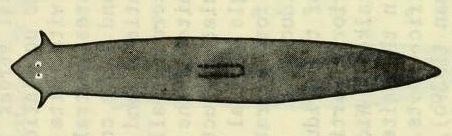

Scientific classification
- Kingdom: Animalia
- Phylum: Platyhelminthes
- Order: Tricladida
- Family: Dugesiidae
- Genus: Girardia
- Species: G. dorotocephala

Binomial name
- Girardia dorotocephala (Woodworth, 1897)

Synonyms
- Planaria dorotocephala Woodworth, 1897; Euplanaria dorotocephala (Woodworth, 1897); Dugesia dorotocephala (Woodworth, 1897); Dugesia agilis (Stringer, 1909); Dugesia diabolis Hyman, 1956; Planaria agilis Stringer, 1909

= Girardia dorotocephala =

Species of flatworm

Girardia dorotocephala is a species of dugesiid triclad native to North America. It has been accidentally introduced in Japan. Girardia dorotocephala is cannibalistic, which led to its usage in memory transfer experiments.
