= Girardia tigrina =

Scientific classification
- Kingdom: Animalia
- Phylum: Platyhelminthes
- Order: Tricladida
- Family: Dugesiidae
- Genus: Girardia
- Species: G. tigrina

Binomial name
- Girardia tigrina (Girard, 1850)

Synonyms
- Dugesia tigrina (Girard,1850); Girardia jimi Martins, 1970; Dugesia jimi Martins, 1970; Euplanaria tigrina (Girard, 1850); Planaria tigrina Girard, 1850

Species of flatworm

Girardia tigrina, known as the brown planarian or the immigrant triclad flatworm, is a species of dugesiid native to the Americas. It has been accidentally introduced into Europe and Japan.

== Description ==
G. tigrina individuals are around 10 mm in length. They have a head with two broad and short auricles. The two eyes are in two pigment-free patches. The dorsal surface of the body has numerous pigment spots.

== Distribution and ecology ==
Originally from the Americas, Girardia tigrina has become an invasive species in Europe and Japan. Since being first recorded in France in 1925, this species has been reported from many other European countries, including Germany, Italy, the Netherlands, Romania, and Wales.

In North Wales, this species has displaced the native triclad species Polycelis nigra and Polycelis tenuis due to its superior exploitation of food.

== Diet ==
G. tigrina is a carnivorous species that feeds on invertebrates such as oligochaetes, isopods, chironomids, snails, caddisflies, and mayflies.

== Karyology ==
The haploid number is n=8. There are diploid (2n=16) and triploid (3n=24) specimens.
