= List of Ouran High School Host Club episodes =

Ouran High School Host Club is an anime series adapted from the manga of the same title by Bisco Hatori. It began broadcasting on April 5, 2006, on Nippon Television and ended on September 26, 2006, adapting the first eight volumes of the manga. The series was directed by Takuya Igarashi and written by Yōji Enokido (Revolutionary Girl Utena, The Melody of Oblivion), while the character designer and chief animation director for the series was Kumiko Takahashi (Cardcaptor Sakura). It also features a different cast from the audio dramas, with Maaya Sakamoto starring as Haruhi Fujioka and Mamoru Miyano portraying Tamaki Suou. Ouran High School Host Club finished its run on September 26, 2006, totaling to twenty-six episodes.

The series is licensed for distribution in North America by FUNimation Entertainment, released across the region in summer 2008. Caitlin Glass is the ADR director of the series. FUNimation announced two cast members every Friday on their website for the series which led up to the main cast announcements at Anime Expo 2008. The first anime DVD set containing the first thirteen episodes was released on October 28, 2008, in North America; and the second volume became available on January 6, 2009, containing the last thirteen episodes. The opening theme is "Sakura Kiss" (桜キッス) by Chieko Kawabe and the ending theme is "Shissō" (疾走) by Last Alliance.

== Episode list ==
No.	Title	Directed by	Original release date
1	"Starting Today, You Are a Host!"; Transliteration: "Kyō kara Kimi wa Hosuto da" (Japanese: 今日から君はホストだ)	Takuya Igarashi	April 4, 2006
Scholarship student Haruhi Fujioka arrives at Ouran Academy where she is mistaken as male due to her short hair and boyish appearance. She stumbles upon the Host Club while looking for a quiet place to study and accidentally breaks a vase worth 8 million yen ($72,600). To pay off the debt, Haruhi is forced to work as the club's errand boy. Once the Hosts realize Haruhi has natural talent for entertaining girls, they promote her to Host-in-Training and will forgive her debt if she obtains 100 paying customers. They also discover she's female, but keep that secret. On her first day as a Host, Haruhi irritates Princess Ayanokoji, one of Tamaki's jealous customers. Ayanokoji is banned from the club for destroying Haruhi's bookbag, but Haruhi's debt is raised to 1,000 customers.
2	"The Job of a High School Host!"; Transliteration: "Kōkōsei Hosuto no O-shigoto" (Japanese: 高校生ホストのお仕事)	Takefumi Anzai	April 11, 2006
Host Club regular, Kanako Kasugazaki, is having trouble with her fiancé, Tooru Suzushima, who is planning to leave to study abroad. The group plans to reunite them at an upcoming dance by making Haruhi dress as a girl and approach Tooru as an admirer. Tooru says he's flattered, but that he cares for someone else. Kanako finds them together and flees, in tears, but Tooru catches up to her and they reaffirm their feelings for one another. At the end of the dance, Kanako is chosen as the queen to be given a kiss on the cheek by Haruhi. Tamaki, realizing this will be Haruhi's first kiss, runs to stop her and stumbles, pushing Haruhi's face into Kanako's with a kiss on the lips.
3	"Beware the Physical Exam!"; Transliteration: "Shintai Kensa ni Go-yōjin" (Japanese: 身体検査にご用心)	Masayuki Iimura	April 18, 2006
The Host Club scrambles to find a way to prevent Haruhi's gender from being discovered during annual physical examinations. Their attempts fail miserably until Kyoya steps in with a doctor who promises not to reveal her secret. Meanwhile, Dr. Yabu enters the room searching for his daughter and is falsely accused of "making a pass" at a female student. Kyoya accurately assesses that the man's daughter is probably attending Ouran Public High School due to Dr. Yabu's story of financial difficulty. Tamaki provides him with directions and Haruhi is impressed by the club's insight and kindness, deciding to stick with them.
4	"Attack of the Lady Manager!"; Transliteration: "Joshi Manējā Shūrai" (Japanese: 女子マネージャー襲来)	Tamaki Nakatsu	April 25, 2006
Renge Hoshakuji, a French otaku arrives at the Host Club, claiming to be Kyoya's fiancée because he looks like an anime character she idolizes. She declares herself Club Manager and decides to make a film highlighting the hosts' darker sides to attract more clients. As they film, she enlists two male students to play villains, but they take offense at being "typecast" by appearance and push Renge away. Haruhi intervenes and loses a contact lens, though it looks as if she is crying, eliciting Tamaki's support. Haruhi clarifies that she is not hurt and helps Renge understand that it is better to accept people as they are than who you want them to be. As they chat, Kyoya breaks the camera lens to destroy what he deems "violent footage" that would damage the club's reputation, but later edits existing footage to sell to their customers. Renge now crushes on Haruhi.
5	"The Twins Fight!"; Transliteration: "Futago Kenkasuru" (Japanese: 双子ケンカする)	Kazuki Kakuta	May 2, 2006
Hikaru and Kaoru trick Haruhi into letting them visit her home by playing the "Which one is Hikaru game?" Haruhi correctly identifies Hikaru, commenting on the differences between them. This triggers a feud between the twins to the point of dyeing their hair pink and blue in order to be told apart. The feud carries into the classroom and later, the refectory where a melee ensues. Haruhi learns that they've never had a fight before, wondering if they know how to end it. Back in Music Room 3, Kaoru threatens Hikaru with Beelzenef, a curse doll obtained from Umehito Nekozawa, President of the Black Magic Club. Haruhi snatches the Beelzenef doll from Kaoru, chastising the twins for taking things too far, adding that if they don't apologize immediately she will never let them visit her home. She then sees that Kaoru only wrote "blank" on the back and realizes the fight was staged.
6	"The Grade School Host is the Naughty Type!"; Transliteration: "Shōgakusei Hosuto wa Yancha-kei" (Japanese: 小学生ホストはやんちゃ系)	Yuji Moriyama	May 9, 2006
An elementary school brat, Shiro Takaoji, seeks help from the Host Club to win the hearts of girls. Renge develops a role for him: being a shota of the naughty type, but Shiro denounces the whole club as idiots and runs away. The Host Club infiltrates his school and discovers that Shiro has a crush on a girl called Hina who will soon be moving away. She and Shiro were supposed to play a piano duet, but Shiro is unprepared. Tamaki brings Shiro back to Music Room 3 and reveals that he, himself, is an accomplished pianist and will tutor Shiro in the upcoming piece. Hina is invited to a special event where she and Shiro play their duet.
7	"Jungle Pool SOS!"; Transliteration: "Janguru Pūru SOS" (Japanese: ジャングルプールSOS)	Takefumi Anzai	May 16, 2006
The Host Club drags Haruhi to an Ootori-run water park where a wave pool separates Honey from the others. Haruhi and Mori set out to look for him and during their search, she learns that the two Hosts are cousins by marriage. Meanwhile, Kyouya hires his family's private police force, The Black Onion Squad, to look for Honey and arrest any suspicious people. The squad mistakes Haruhi for Honey and Mori as a suspicious person. Honey swings in on a vine, amazing Haruhi with his martial arts ability in subduing the guards who apologize profusely for attacking Haruhi and Mori and claim to be honored to be beaten by the great Mitsukuni Haninozuka, nationally-renowned martial artist. The Host Club reunites and Haruhi mentions that she would prefer visiting an actual beach.
8	"The Sun, the Sea, and the Host Club!"; Transliteration: "Taiyō to Umi to Hosuto-bu" (Japanese: 太陽と海とホスト部)	Masayuki Iimura	May 23, 2006
The Host Club visits a beach in Okinawa with customers. Hikaru and Kaoru invent a game of finding out what frightens Haruhi. Kyouya hypes the competition by offering photos of Haruhi in middle school, but declines to explain how he obtained them. In turn, the other Hosts unsuccessfully try to scare Haruhi. She later confronts two drunken trespassers who threaten some of the girls, so they push her off a rock face into the ocean. Tamaki rescues Haruhi, then rebukes her for being reckless, causing them to avoid each other for the rest of the day. Noticing that Haruhi fails to understand her vulnerability, Kyouya pins Haruhi to his bed while they are alone at the Ootori family resort home, saying, "As a man, I could go after you at any time and, as a woman, you couldn't stop me." Haruhi replies that she knows he will not harm her, adding, "You played the villain to teach me, right?" Kyouya leaves when Tamaki enters the room, after which Tamaki discovers that Haruhi suffers from Brontophobia, a fear of thunder. The Club walks in to see Tamaki covering Haruhi's eyes and ears to help her with her phobia, and the twins accuse him of being "an S&M pervert."
9	"A Challenge from Lobelia Girls' Academy!"; Transliteration: "Roberia Jogakuin no Chōsen" (Japanese: ロベリア女学院の挑戦)	Shingo Kaneko	May 30, 2006
Benio "Benibara" Amakusa, head of the Zuka Club at St. Lobelia Girls' Academy, chances upon Haruhi and, instantly realizing that she is a girl, tries to convince her to enroll at her school and her club. Along with two of her clubmates, they disparage the Host Club and men in numerous ways, revealing their lesbian natures and belief in female superiority. Tamaki's half-Japanese/half-French background is revealed and Haruhi learns that one of her personal belongings was auctioned off on the Host Club's online auction site. She leaves the club in anger and convinced that Haruhi might be upset enough to transfer to St. Lobelia, the Hosts don frilly dresses to show her that she can be around boys and girls at the same time if she remains at Ouran. Haruhi finds this hilarious, but shares that she came to Ouran Academy for a specific reason and never planned on leaving. The Zuka Club girls leave but refuse to give up, warning that they will be back for Haruhi.
10	"A Day in the Life of the Fujioka Family!"; Transliteration: "Fujioka-ke no Nichijō" (Japanese: 藤岡家の日常)	Yū Nobuta	June 6, 2006
Tamaki awakens from a nightmare in which he sees Haruhi living in poverty. He enlists the others and they go to Haruhi's apartment where she resigns herself to letting them in and serving them tea. When Honey asks Haruhi to prepare lunch, they prepare to go to the commoners supermarket. As Tamaki lags behind to pay respects to the shrine of Haruhi's late mother, he and Haruhi exchange a moment of empathy, but he trips and falls on top of her, making a bad first impression on Haruhi's father, Ryouji "Ranka" Fujioka, as he arrives home from work. Later, Ryouji reveals that he is a professional cross-dresser named "Ranka" and has been in contact with Kyouya ever since Haruhi became a Host. Haruhi is thoroughly annoyed and goes shopping by herself. Ryouji and the Hosts stalk Haruhi and though Tamaki tries to impress Ranka with his appreciation for Haruhi, Ryouji refers to him as "the enemy."
11	"Big Brother is a Prince!"; Transliteration: "Onii-chama wa Ōji-sama" (Japanese: お兄ちゃまは王子様)	Shin Matsuo	June 13, 2006
Kirimi Nekozawa, a young girl, comes to Ouran Academy searching for her older brother, Umehito Nekozawa. She finds and labels the Host Club a "reverse harem" filled with "debauchery," terms the Hosts find startling, given her age. When Kirimi sees Tamaki's blond hair, she mistakes him for Umehito. Kuretake and Kadomatsu, two Nekozawa family servants, arrive to retrieve her, revealing that Kirimi is afraid of the dark while Umehito is afraid of the light. Umehito enters, but with his black cloak, black wig and Beelzenef cat puppet, he frightens Kirimi, causing Umehito to leave, dejected. Afterwards, Tamaki and Renge coach Nekozawa into becoming the princely figure who will save Kirimi from the monster in her house who, in actuality, is Nekozawa wearing his dark clothes. Tamaki and Renge convince him to give up his cloak and wig, saying his photophobia is psychological. This leads to him saving Kirimi from a large unfriendly cat and proves his bravery. Despite temporarily overcoming his photophobia, Umehito succumbs to his skin's sensitivity to sunlight and collapses. The Host Club believes they were unsuccessful when, in reality, the Nekozawa siblings reforge their bond.
12	"Honey's Three Bitter Days"; Transliteration: "Hanī-senpai no Amakunai Mikkakan" (Japanese: ハニー先輩の甘くない三日間)	Mitsutaka Noshitani	June 20, 2006
Honey's stuffed bunny, Usa-chan, is stained with tea, with Tamaki and the twins terrified of Honey's reaction when he finds out. Haruhi learns more about Honey's bad temper if awakened from his nap early and his martial arts abilities that once caused a diplomatic crisis between Japan and America. During club hours, Honey experiences tooth pain and Mori discovers a cavity, so he forbids Honey having desserts or snacks. Honey unsuccessfully tries to obtain sweets, taking his frustration out on Mori by judo-throwing him. Haruhi realizes that Mori wants punishment for not being more watchful and when Honey learns this, the cousins make amends. Once Honey's cavity is repaired, he's happy but Kyouya is not because purchasing the snacks cost the club money and Kyouya, as the "Shadow King," keeps the club afloat financially while Tamaki is the outward "King" who keeps the guests happy.
13	"Haruhi in Wonderland!"; Transliteration: "Fushigi no Kuni no Haruhi" (Japanese: 不思議の国のハルヒ)	Takuya Igarashi	June 27, 2006
Haruhi's dream about the day of her admission into Ouran High School is viewed as an Alice in Wonderland fantasy. She meets Shiro Takaoji as a mouse, Kyouya Ootori as the Caterpillar, and Hikaru and Kaoru Hitachiin as twin Cheshire Cats. She runs into a Mad Hatter that resembles Tamaki, a March Hare that resembles Honey and a Dormouse that resembles Mori, as well as a Duchess that resembles Renge, a Dodo that resembles Kanako and a Cook that resembles Ayanokoji. Throughout the dream, they all try to give Haruhi advice, but she only understands when she appears before the royal court in defense of the Duchess. The king turns out to be Ryouji and the queen, Kotoko (her late mother), who tells Haruhi to enjoy her life as it occurs instead of just focusing on the future. Haruhi wakes up with tears in her eyes and sees the Host Club dressed up in costumes similar to the ones they wore in her dream. She comments that the club has too much fun, but her attitude says she's glad that it does.
14	"Covering The Famous Host Club!"; Transliteration: "Uwasa no Hosuto-bu o Shuzaise yo" (Japanese: 噂のホスト部を取材せよ)	Takefumi Anzai	July 4, 2006
The failing Newspaper Club has become a gossip rap and needs a legitimate article to prevent dissolution. Editor-in-Chief, Akira Komatsuzawa, is especially interested in finding something with which to Blackmail Tamaki because he believes Tamaki is using his family's power to control the popular students and he wants to exploit that information for his own benefit. Hard as they try as they observe the Host Club playing outdoor children's games, they are unable to "scoop" evidence about Tamaki's non-existent dark side. Akira decides to fabricate gossip, but is thwarted by the Host Club. When Haruhi inquires about Tamaki's parents, she learns that Tamaki's father is the Chairman of Ouran Academy, the benefactor of her scholarship.
15	"The Refreshing Battle of Karuizawa!"; Transliteration: "Karuizawa Sawayaka Batoru" (Japanese: 軽井沢さわやかバトル)	Satomi Nakamura	July 11, 2006
During summer break, Haruhi works at a pension in Karuizawa under the care of Misuzu Sonoda, a friend of Ryouji's. When the Host Club finds out, they helicopter there, much to Haruhi's dismay. Since they all want to stay at the pension, Misuzu conducts a "refreshment" contest to see who can have the only available room remaining. The contest involves getting chores done while having guests see handsome boys working on the property. Honey is disqualified as being too babyish, which also eliminates Mori. The twins have the upper hand as Tamaki struggles to be refreshing. Kyouya sits out the competition but assists Tamaki, who charms Misuzu by playing the piano. In the end, Hikaru and Kaoru win by inadvertently demonstrating their "brotherly love." They share the room and in the morning, but are grumpy and rude. Just then, a friend of Haruhi's from middle school appears as a delivery boy and reconnects with Haruhi.
16	"Operation Haruhi and Hikaru’s First Date!"; Transliteration: "Haruhi to Hikaru Hatsu Dēto Daisakusen" (Japanese: ハルヒと光 初デート大作戦)	Kazuki Kakuta	July 18, 2006
Hikaru is rude to Haruhi's middle school friend, Arai, after learning that he used to have a crush on her. Haruhi slaps Hikaru who goes off to sulk. Kaoru invites her out on a date to make amends, but feigns illness in order for Hikaru to go with her. Kaoru hopes Haruhi can help Hikaru develop some social skills, but it seems hopeless when they again encounter Arai and Hikaru runs off just before a thunderstorm strikes. Worried about Haruhi, Tamaki calls Hikaru, accuses him of selfishness, telling him that Haruhi is afraid of thunder, thus revealing her weakness. Hikaru eventually finds Haruhi hiding under the altar of a church, where he comforts her and apologizes for his behavior. Kaoru remarks to Kyouya that Hikaru will not notice his feelings for Haruhi because he is a dummy, while Kyouya comments that their club is full of dummies.
17	"Kyouya's Reluctant Day Out!"; Transliteration: "Kyōya no Fuhon'i na Kyūjitsu" (Japanese: 鏡夜の不本意な休日)	Inuo Inukawa	July 25, 2006
Kyouya, whose low blood pressure makes him irritable upon awakening, is dragged out of bed by the Hosts and taken to a mall in order to study commoners. Left asleep on a bench, Kyouya awakens and notices he is without his wallet or cellphone. Luckily, he meets Haruhi and they spend the day together. Kyouya is curt but reveals that he is the youngest of three sons and, as such, finds it a challenge to surpass his exemplary brothers in order to meet his father's expectations. They encounter a vendor advertising fake pottery as genuine artwork and when a woman is about make a purchase, Kyouya steps in and reveals both his knowledge of art and the vendor's trickery. Haruhi is impressed by his altruism, but Kyouya claims the woman he helped is the wife of an influential man, whose possible alliance may benefit the Ootori family. They reunite with the Hosts and find Tamaki has purchased a dog which he names Antoinette. Haruhi comments to Kyouya that he really is a lot like Tamaki in his dedication to helping people even though he (Kyouya ) pretends to not care. Kyouya is impressed by her insight.
18	"Chika's “Down with Honey” Declaration!"; Transliteration: "Chika-kun no Hanī Datō Sengen" (Japanese: チカ君のハニー打倒宣言)	Yū Nobuta	August 1, 2006
Honey's younger brother, Yasuchika "Chika" Haninozuka, visits the Host Club. Family tradition demands a martial arts duel upon siblings meeting and, as usual, Honey wins. Chika demands that Honey steer clear of him at school. After he leaves, Haruhi learns how Honey quit being the Captain of the Ouran Karate Club in order to join the Host Club. Tamaki insists on helping the brothers reunite so they go to the dojo where Chika is now Captain of the Karate Club. Chika confronts them, calling his brother an "alien" because Honey eats three whole cakes for dessert every night and holds a weekly midnight cakefest; this, without gaining weight. Honey apologizes for causing pain and suffering, but won't give up being true to himself. To settle the score, they have a martial arts duel, the stakes being Honey giving up his weekly midnight cakefest if he loses. Mori is confident Honey will throw the fight, but is devastated when Honey beats his brother. Honey considers Haruhi's opinion that if he loves cake more than his brother, he's really a terrible person, but also Tamaki's opinion that true strength means being true to yourself. Honey's response is to simply hug Usa-chan while saying, "I love you."
19	"Lobelia Girls' Academy Strikes Back!"; Transliteration: "Roberia Jogakuin no Gyakushū" (Japanese: ロベリア女学院の逆襲)	Shingo Kaneko	August 8, 2006
The Lobelia girls kidnap Haruhi and bring her to St. Lobelia Girls' Academy where they dress her in uniform and invite her to join the Zuka Club. She refuses until she learns that Benibara's late mother would be disappointed in Benibara for cancelling the show. Meanwhile, the Host Club freaks out when they visit Ryouji and learn that Haruhi is with the Lobelia girls. They infiltrate St. Lobelia, spy on Haruhi's rehearsal and pretend to be fans of Lady Benibara in order to get close enough to Haruhi to rescue her. During the actual show, Tamaki overhears that there's to be a "kiss scene" and when Benibara speaks lines about revenge, the spotlight shines on the Hosts and Ryouji. Kyouya, in the meantime, has charmed his way into the control room and taken command of the technical console, having the image of Haruhi kissing Kanako at the Dance Party projected onto a large onstage screen for the world to see, thereby thwarting Benibara's hope to steal Haruhi's first kiss. The episode ends with the Zuka Club and the Hosts chasing Haruhi around the stage.
20	"The Door the Twins Opened!"; Transliteration: "Futago ga Aketa Tobira" (Japanese: 双子があけた扉)	Satomi Nakamura	August 15, 2006
As children, the twins had a maid they adored but who was, in reality, a thief. They tell her that if she can tell who is who between them, they'll give her the combination to the safe kept hidden in their piggy bank. Unable to tell them apart, the maid breaks open the piggy bank after they fall asleep and robs the family. As she descends from the upper stories of the mansion, the twins wake up and go to her, asking why she broke her promise. She says that she can't tell them apart and, perhaps, no one ever will. This begins their dysfunctional view of others being untrustworthy unless they can tell the twins apart. When they meet Tamaki in middle school, he asks them to join the Host Club and they agree, provided Tamaki can tell who is who, giving him a month to do so. Over time, they grow bored and tell Tamaki to get lost, going back to being mean and selfish, playing tricks on girls who like them and isolating themselves from others. Tamaki, despite being dismissed, is determined and finally figures out which twin is which. They dislike his reason of "intuition," but Tamaki helps Hikaru and Kaoru understand that it's okay to be who they are, but if they remain isolated, they'll never meet the person who can really tell them apart. The twins decide to be a part of the Host Club and enter, as usual, together.
21	"Until the Day it Becomes a Pumpkin!"; Transliteration: "Itsuka Kabocha ni naru Hi made" (Japanese: いつかカボチャになる日まで)	Ikurō Satō	August 22, 2006
Class 1-A runs "The Halloween Test-of-Courage Tournament," in which teams scare each other. Class 1-A president, Kazukiyo Soga; Haruhi and the twins are Team B. Kazukiyo reveals that he has nyctophobia, a fear of the dark, a fact he wants kept secret. The twins hear this, but stop teasing him once he also reveals his "pure-hearted" crush on Momoka Kurakano, Class 1-A's vice-president. Nekozawa and the rest of the Host Club join forces to scare Team B using Tamaki dressed as the Clocktower Witch to terrify them. Haruhi and Hikaru trip a net that traps them above ground while Kaoru and Soga are shoved and locked in an empty room by Kuretake and Kadomatsu. There, Kaoru muses to Soga about "the carriage being turned back to a pumpkin" which, to Kaoru, means that Tamaki's idealization of the Host Club as family will one day end, as will his own "special relationship" to Hikaru. Haruhi and Hikaru break free courtesy of a hidden sewing kit and they all reunite with Class 1-A. Nekozawa frightens everyone by casting a shadow of Beelzenef on the domed skylight, thus earning Class 1-A the title of "The Captains of all Cowards."
22	"Mori Has an Apprentice Candidate!"; Transliteration: "Mori-senpai ni Deshiiri Shigan" (Japanese: モリ先輩に弟子入り志願)	Takefumi Anzai	August 29, 2006
When the son of a gangster, Ritsu Kasanoda, seeks out Mori for tips on how to change his scary appearance and gain friends, the Host Club jumps at the opportunity to assist. They constantly misspeak Kasanoda's name by calling him Casanova and Bossanova, as well as dress him in ridiculous outfits. When Kasanoda meets Haruhi, he's attracted to her which leads to confusion about his sexuality, since he believes her to be a boy. When two rival gang members attempt to hurt Kasanoda, Honey and Mori intervene. The thugs demand that Tetsuya Sendo, one of Kasanoda's 'fellas, be returned but Tetsuya appears and demands they leave before sharing with the Hosts how he came to serve his young lord. Kasanoda is touched by everyone's good will and goes to find Haruhi, who is changing in Music Room 3 and, just like Tamaki, he learns about Haruhi's gender by accident.
23	"Tamaki's Unwitting Depression!"; Transliteration: "Tamaki no Mujikaku na Yūutsu" (Japanese: 環の無自覚な憂鬱)	Shin Matsuo	September 5, 2006
After Kasanoda realizes that Haruhi is a girl, he's terrified of being hurt by the Host Club, but promises to keep her secret. His 'fellas are confused because they still think Haruhi is a boy. When Kasanoda next visits the Host Club as a customer, he requests Haruhi; and because the other guests also think Haruhi is a boy, they become excited about the Yaoi possibilities. Tamaki is catatonic at the thought of Haruhi living as a Mob Wife, whereas Kyouya is thrilled because attendance at the club is up. The twins are furious with Tamaki for being useless in a crisis and Kyouya for being a "money grubbing enabler." Kasanoda tries to tell Haruhi how he feels about her, but can't because he's shy and because others would see him as gay. Haruhi resolves the issue by saying they'll be great friends, causing the girls to feel a surge of moe feeling that makes them rush to comfort him. Tamaki, however, confronts Kasanoda as an irate "father" to which Kasanoda says he's not her dad. Haruhi says Tamaki does act like her father, restoring Tamaki's fantasy, though Haruhi, herself, is oblivious to everything.
24	"And so Kyouya Met Him!"; Transliteration: "Soshite Kyōya wa Deatta" (Japanese: そして鏡夜は出会った)	Tomoki Kyoda	September 12, 2006
When Haruhi asks Kyouya how they became friends, Kyouya reveals that it was because his father, Yoshio Ootori, insisted that it would be good for business. Kyouya says he would do anything his father asked at that time so he puts up with the transfer student's odd requests, travelling all over Japan while trying to wrap his head around the effluent Tamaki, but can neither anticipate nor control him, which he finds frustrating. One Sunday, Tamaki shows up at Kyouya's house unannounced, but before Kyouya can politely eject him, he's mesmerized by Tamaki's soulful musicianship (as are the other three Ootori siblings). Afterwards, as they share tea, Tamaki manages to push every button Kyouya has, who snaps at him for not appreciating his easy path to his family's patriarchy, whereas Kyouya, as the youngest son, has to fight just to be acknowledged by his father. Tamaki tells Kyouya that the only one holding Kyouya back is himself. Kyouya sees the ironic truth and laughs, demolishing the barriers between them and beginning a true friendship. Later that year, they sit under a kotatsu and make plans to form the Host Club.
25	"The Host Club Declares Dissolution!"; Transliteration: "Hosuto-bu Kaisan Sengen" (Japanese: ホスト部解散宣言)	Shingo Kaneko	September 19, 2006
The annual Ouran Fair is a chance for the school's clubs to showcase student leadership skills and a talent for upward mobility. The Host Club is using the Main Salon to entertain their visitors and they charm everyone but for a mysterious diva who watches everything through opera glasses. Tamaki's father, Yuzuru Suoh, meets Haruhi for the first time and Haruhi notes that while they don't look alike, they share a flair for flirting. Yoshio Ootori, Kyouya's father, slaps him for wasting his time on a frivolous club, but Haruhi defends Kyouya, beginning to see the downside of wealth. She learns more of this when Tamaki's grandmother, Shizue Suoh, arrives being curt and dismissive to Tamaki, but introducing him to the Lady Éclair, the mysterious diva who his grandmother commands he chaperone. Éclair is revealed to be wealthy and powerful, but also haughty and selfish. Tamaki is engaged to Éclair on his grandmother's orders and the Host Club is declared dissolved as of the end of the festival, at which point Tamaki will leave Japan with Éclair. Haruhi also learns of Tamaki's mother, who was his father's mistress and how Tamaki's entrance into the prestigious Suoh family was conditional on Tamaki never being allowed to see his mother again.
26	"This is Our Ouran Fair!"; Transliteration: "Kore ga Oretachi no Ōran-sai" (Japanese: これが俺たちの桜蘭祭)	Takuya Igarashi	September 26, 2006
Lady Éclair pays off Haruhi's debt once she notices Tamaki's interest in her, but Haruhi declines leaving, realizing she doesn't want to lose her friends. Kyouya learns that Tamaki is on his way to the airport with Lady Éclair. The hosts race against time to recover Tamaki but find that Yoshio Ootori has ordered the Black Onion Squad to keep them from interfering. Haruhi, Hikaru and Kaoru use a horse-drawn carriage to pursue the couple while Kyouya, Honey and Mori battle the Ootori family police. Hikaru gets hurt in a carriage crash and Kaoru stays behind to care for him. Haruhi catches up to the car carrying Tamaki and Éclair as they cross a bridge and she stands, begging Tamaki to return. Tamaki begins to respond but is stopped by Éclair. Haruhi falls from the carriage and off the bridge. Éclair, realizing where Tamaki's heart truly lies, releases him and Tamaki thanks her before jumping from the car to save Haruhi. At the Ouran Ball, Haruhi dances with all the members of the Host Club. Yuzuru and Yoshio discuss their sons, with Yoshio revealing that Kyouya had outmaneuvered him by stealing his company, then giving it back as proof he didn't need it to be happy. Both men agree to remain friends, but disagree over whether Tamaki or Kyouya will marry Haruhi. The final scene returns to Music Room 3 as the Hosts thank the viewers for watching.
