= Memory transfer =

Historically proposed biological process

Memory transfer was a biological process proposed by James V. McConnell and others in the 1960s. Memory transfer proposes a chemical basis for memory termed memory RNA which can be passed down through flesh instead of an intact nervous system. Since RNA encodes information and living cells produce and modify RNA in reaction to external events, it might also be used in neurons to record stimuli. This was proposed as an explanation for the results of McConnell's experiments in which planarians retained memory of acquired information after regeneration.

In McConnell's experiments, he classically conditioned planarians to contract their bodies upon exposure to light by pairing it with an electric shock. The planarians retained this acquired information after being sliced and regenerated, even after multiple slicings to produce a planarian where none of the original trained planarian was present. The same held true after the planarians were ground up and fed to untrained cannibalistic planarians, usually Dugesia dorotocephala. As the nervous system was fragmented but the nucleic acids were not, this seemed to indicate the existence of memory RNA. Some further experiments seem to support the original findings in that some memories may be stored outside the brain, but McConnell's experiments proved to be largely irreproducible and it was later suggested that only sensitization was transferred, or that no transfer occurred and the effect was due to stress hormones in the donor or pheromone trails left on dirty lab glass. Memory transfer through memory RNA is not currently a well-accepted explanation for the planarian behavior.

== See also ==
- Scotophobin
