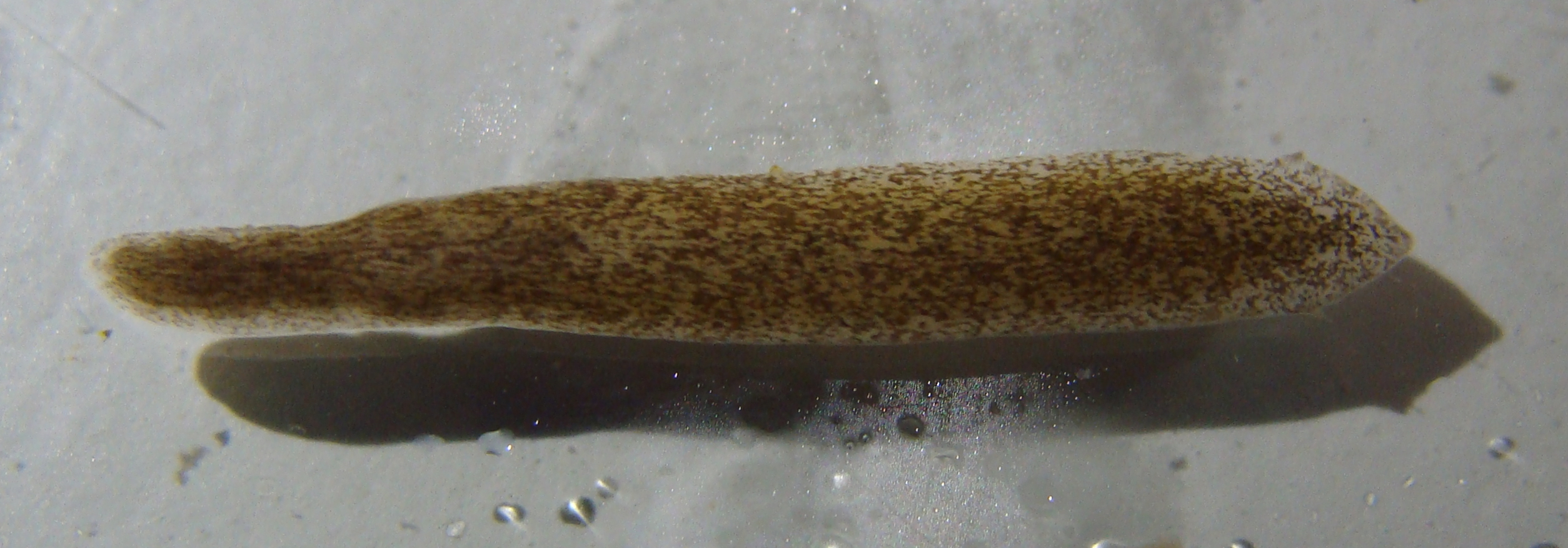
- Girardia sp.

Scientific classification
- Kingdom: Animalia
- Phylum: Platyhelminthes
- Order: Tricladida
- Family: Dugesiidae
- Genus: Girardia; Ball, 1974

Species
- See text

= Girardia =

Genus of flatworms

Girardia is a genus of freshwater planarians belonging to the family Dugesiidae.

== Distribution ==
The genus Girardia is endemic to the Americas, from Argentina to Canada, although most species occur in South America. The only two species known to occur naturally in North America, Girardia tigrina and Girardia dorotocephala, have been introduced in other continents and islands.

== Description ==
Species of Girardia are very similar to species of other genera of Dugesiidae and few apomorphies that clearly define the genus are known. One of the few exclusive characteristics is the presence of pigment granules in the outer pharyngeal wall.

Until 1991 Girardia was considered a subgenus of Dugesia, then it was upgraded to the genus rank. However, some works continued to use the old genus for some Girardia species, mainly for Girardia dorotocephala and Girardia tigrina.

== Species ==
- Girardia alba Morais & Leal-Zanchet, 2025
- Girardia anceps (Kenk, 1930)
- Girardia anderlani (Kawakatsu & Hauser, 1983)
- Girardia andina (Borelli, 1895)
- Girardia antillana (Kenk, 1941)
- Girardia arenicola Hellmann & Leal-Zanchet, 2018
- Girardia arimana (Hyman, 1957)
- Girardia arizonensis (Kenk, 1975)
- Girardia arndti Marcus, 1946
- Girardia asymmetrica Hellmann & Leal-Zanchet, 2020
- Girardia aurita (Kennel, 1888)
- Girardia avertiginis Sluys, 2005
- Girardia azteca (Benazzi & Giannini, 1971)
- Girardia barbarae (Mitchell & Kawakatsu, 1973)
- Girardia biapertura Sluys, 1997
- Girardia bonaerensis (Moretto, 1996)
- Girardia bursalacertosa Sluys, 2005
- Girardia cameliae (Furhmann, 1912)
- Girardia canai Curino & Cazzaniga, 1993
- Girardia capacivasa Sluys & Kawakatsu, 2005
- Girardia clandestina Sluys & Benítez-Álvarez, 2023
- Girardia corumbataiensis Morais & Leal-Zanchet, 2021
- Girardia chilla (Marcus, 1954)
- Girardia cubana (Codreanu & Balcesco, 1973)
- Girardia desiderensis Souza & Leal-Zanchet, 2016
- Girardia dorotocephala (Woodworth, 1897)
- Girardia dubia (Borelli, 1895)
- Girardia festae (Borelli, 1898)
- Girardia glandulosa (Kenk, 1930)
- Girardia graffi (Weiss, 1909)
- Girardia guatemalensis (Mitchell & Kawakatsu, 1973)
- Girardia hoernesi (Weiss, 1910)
- Girardia hypoglauca (Marcus, 1948)
- Girardia ibitipoca Hellmann & Leal-Zanchet, 2020
- Girardia informis Sluys & Grant, 2006
- Girardia jenkinsae (Benazzi & Gourbault, 1977)
- Girardia jugosa Sluys, 2005
- Girardia longistriata (Furhmann, 1912)
- Girardia mckenziei (Mitchell & Kawakatsu, 1973)
- Girardia microbursalis (Hyman, 1931)
- Girardia multidiverticulata Souza, Morais, Cordeiro & Leal-Zanchet, 2015
- Girardia nobrensis Morais & Leal-Zanchet, 2021
- Girardia nonatoi (Marcus, 1946)
- Girardia paramensis (Fuhrmann, 1912)
- Girardia patiensis Morais & Leal-Zanchet, 2025
- Girardia paucipunctata Hellmann & Leal-Zanchet, 2018
- Girardia pierremartini Souza & Leal-Zanchet, 2016
- Girardia polyorchis (Fuhrmann, 1912)
- Girardia rincona (Marcus, 1954)
- Girardia sanchezi (Hyman, 1955)
- Girardia schubarti (Marcus, 1946)
- Girardia seclusa (de Beauchamp, 1940)
- Girardia sinensis Chen & Wang, 2015
- Girardia somuncura Lenguas Francavilla, Negrete, Martínez-Aquino, Damborenea & Brusa, 2021
- Girardia spelaea Hellmann & Leal-Zanchet, 2020
- Girardia sphincter Sluys & Kawakatsu, 2001
- Girardia striata (Weiss, 1910)
- Girardia tahitiensis Gourbault, 1977
- Girardia tigrina (Girard, 1850)
- Girardia tomasi Lenguas Francavilla, Negrete, Martínez-Aquino, Damborenea & Brusa, 2021
- Girardia titicacana (Hyman, 1939)
- Girardia typhlomexicana (Mitchell & Kawakatsu, 1973)
- Girardia ururiograndeana (Kawakatsu, Hauser & Ponce de Leon, 1992)

== Phylogeny ==
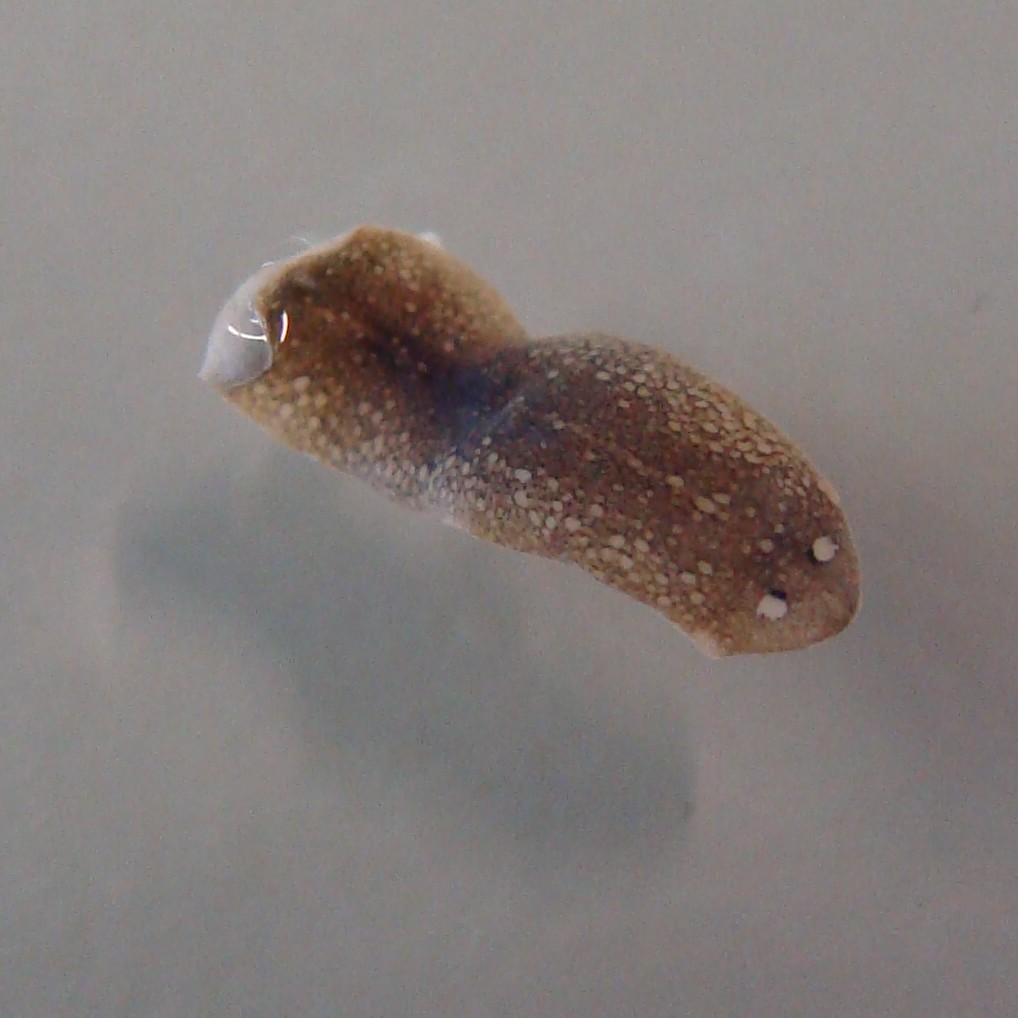
Girardia sp. specimen preserved in alcohol.

Phylogenetic tree including five dugesiid genera after Álvarez-Presas et al., 2008:

- Dugesiidae
  - Girardia
  - - Neppia
    - - Cura
      - - Schmidtea
        - Dugesia
