= Fear of the dark =

Common fear or phobia among children and, to a varying degree, adults

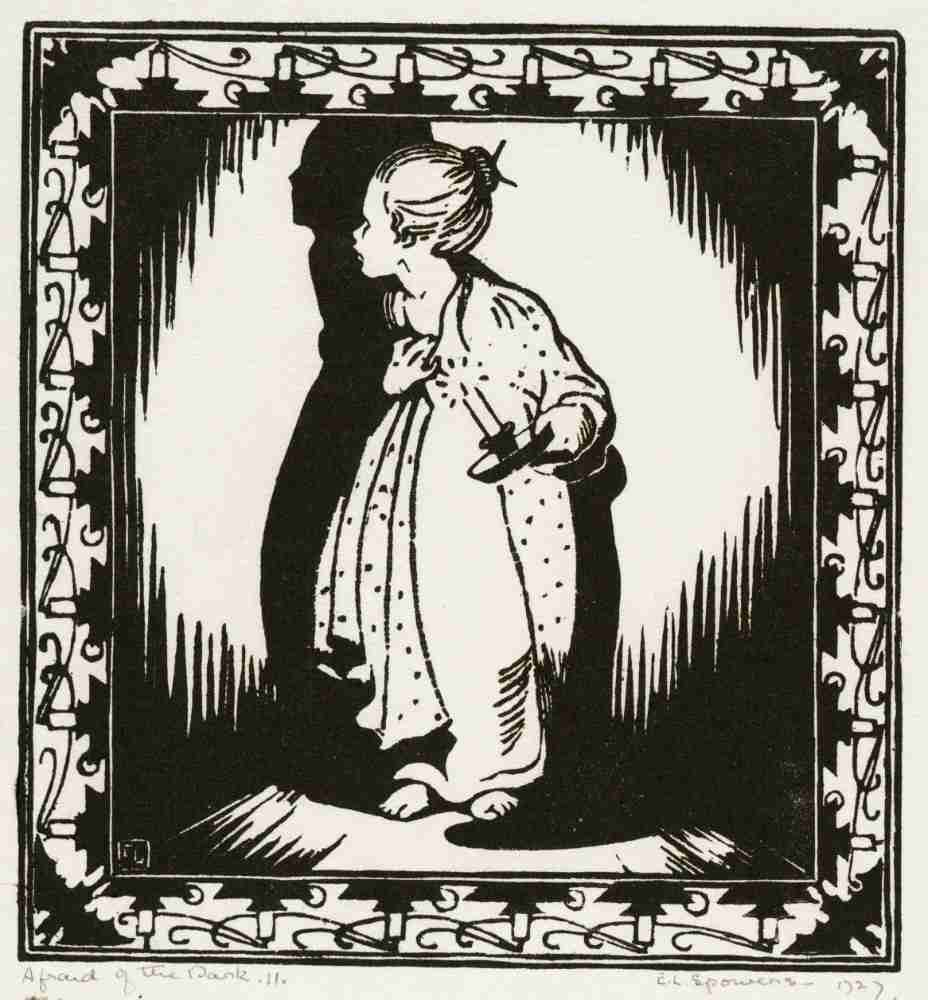
Artistic depiction of a child afraid of the dark and frightened by their shadow. (Linocut by the artist Ethel Spowers (1927).)

Fear of the dark is a common fear or phobia among toddlers, children and, to a varying degree, adults. A fear of the dark does not always concern darkness itself; it can also be a fear of possible or imagined dangers concealed by darkness. Most toddlers and children outgrow it, but this fear persists for some as a phobia and anxiety. When waking up or sleeping, these fears may intertwine with sighting sleep paralysis demons in some people. Some degree of fear of the dark is natural, especially as a phase of child development. Most observers report that fear of the dark rarely appears before the age of two years and roughly peaks around the development stage of four years of age. When fear of the dark reaches a degree that is severe enough to be considered pathological, it is sometimes called scotophobia (from σκότος – "darkness"), or lygophobia (from λυγή – "twilight").

Some researchers, beginning with Sigmund Freud, consider the fear of the dark to be a manifestation of separation anxiety disorder.

An alternate hypothesis was posited in the 1960s, when scientists conducted experiments in a search for molecules responsible for memory. In one experiment, rats, normally nocturnal animals, were conditioned to fear the dark and a substance called "scotophobin" was supposedly extracted from the rats' brains; this substance was claimed to be responsible for remembering this fear. These findings were subsequently debunked.

== Nyctophobia ==
Nyctophobia (or noctophobia) is a phobia characterized by a severe fear of the night. It is triggered by the brain's disfigured perception of what would, or could, happen when in a night-time environment. It can also be temporarily triggered if the mind is unsteady or scared about recent events or ideas, or a partaking in content the brain considers a threat (examples could include indulging in horror content, or having linked dark environments to prior events or ideas that disturb the mind). Normally, since humans are not nocturnal by nature, they are usually a bit more cautious or alert at night than in the day, since the dark is a vastly different environment. Nyctophobia produces symptoms beyond the normal instinctive parameters, such as breathlessness, excessive sweating, nausea, dry mouth, feeling sick, shaking, heart palpitations, inability to speak or think clearly or sensation of detachment from reality and death. Nyctophobia can be severely detrimental physically and mentally if these symptoms are not resolved. There are many types of therapies to help manage nyctophobia.

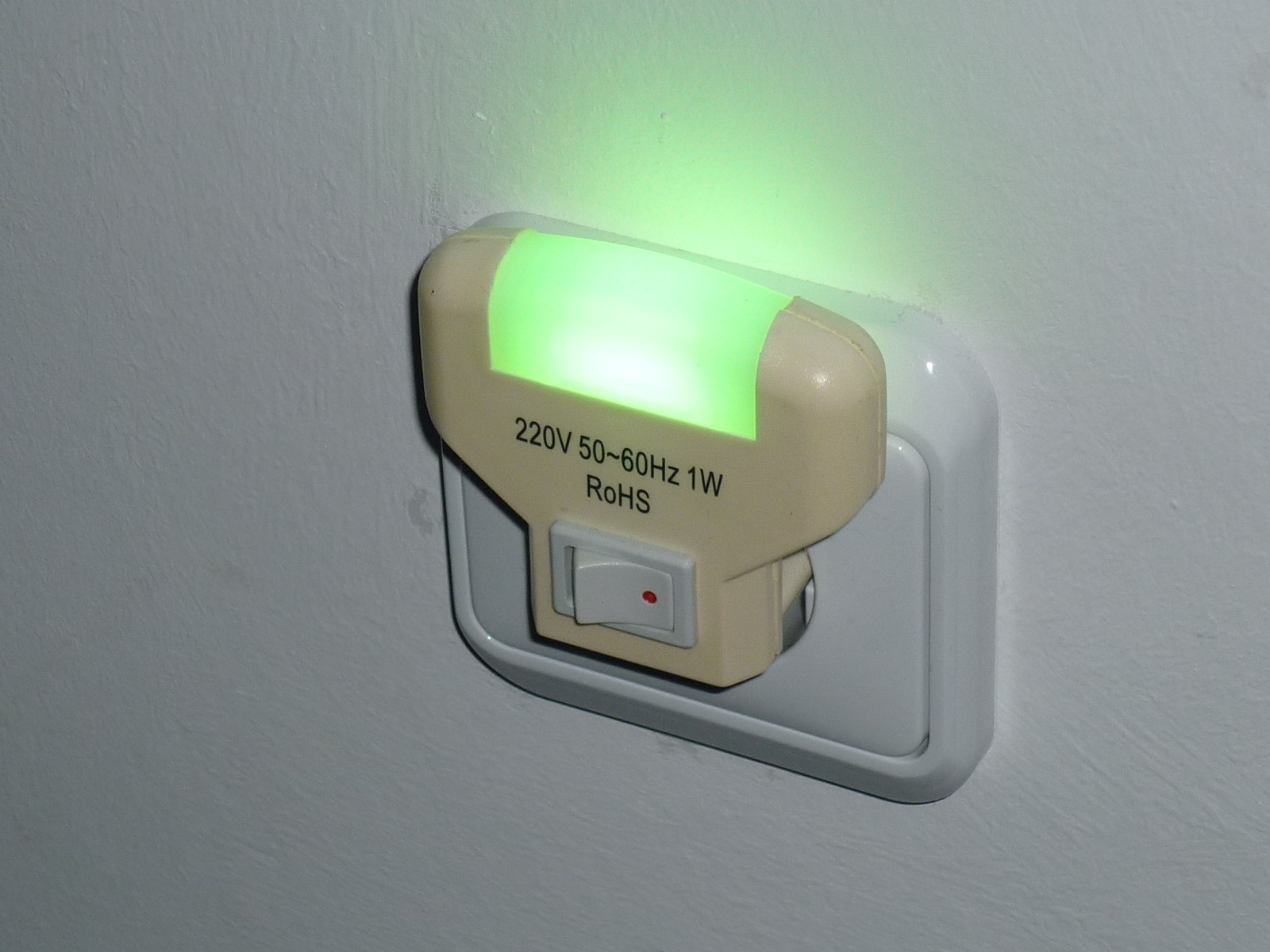
Nightlights, such as this one, may be used to counteract fear of the dark.

Nyctophobia may also be tied to nocturnal creatures, whether fictional or real. For instance, someone who experiences sanguivoriphobia, a fear of vampires, might also experience nyctophobia due to an association with vampires. Similarly, someone with chiroptophobia, or fear of bats, might also likewise have nyctophobia due to their association with the night or dark spaces.

Exposure therapy can be very effective when exposing the person to darkness. With this method, a therapist can help with relaxation strategies such as meditation. Another form of therapy is cognitive behavioural therapy. Therapists can help guide patients with behavior routines that are performed daily and nightly to reduce the symptoms associated with nyctophobia. In severe cases, anti-depressants and anti-anxiety medication drugs can be effective to those dealing with symptoms that may not be manageable if therapy could not reduce the symptoms of nyctophobia.

Despite its pervasive nature, there has been a lack of etiological research on the subject. Nyctophobia is generally observed in children but, according to J. Adrian Williams' article "Indirect Hypnotic Therapy of Nyctophobia: A Case Report", many clinics with pediatric patients have a great chance of having adults who have nyctophobia. The same article states that "the phobia has been known to be extremely disruptive to adult patients and... incapacitating".

The word nyctophobia comes from the Greek νυκτός, nyktos, genitive of νύξ, nyx, "night" and φόβος, phobos, "fear".

== Scotophobia ==
Although not clinically recognised, scotophobia has gained traction in social circles, it is often described as a more vague version of nyctophobia, being ascribed only to darkness or dark spaces. Those suffering from scotophobia might fear dark basements, attics, tunnels, forests, rooms, or other spaces without light.

Other names have been put forth for this specific phobia, such as achluophobia (from greek ἀχλύς, akhlús, meaning "mist" or "darkness", and φόβος, phobos, meaning "fear"), as well as lygophobia (from Greek λυγή, lygos, meaning "twilight", and φόβος, phobos, meaning "fear").

== See also ==
- Childhood phobia
- List of phobias
