= Oregoniplana geniculata =

Scientific classification
- Domain: Eukaryota
- Kingdom: Animalia
- Phylum: Platyhelminthes
- Order: Tricladida
- Family: Cercyridae
- Genus: Oregoniplana
- Species: O. geniculata

Binomial name
- Oregoniplana geniculata Li & Wang, 2019

Species of planarian

Oregoniplana geniculata is a species of planarian belonging to the Cercyridae. Its type locality is China.

== Etymology ==
The specific epithet derives from the Latin geniculatus, meaning "like the bent knee", referring to the curved penis papilla of the species.

== Description ==
Oregoniplana geniculata exhibits variability in body shape, ranging from elongate to ovate-lanceolate. When elongated, it measures 1600–2500 μm in length and 290–510 μm in width. ItsIts dorsal surface features a brownish coloration over a cream-colored background, with pigment concentrated along the body's margin and around the testes and ovaries. It possesses two black, semilunar eyes spaced approximately 67–171 μm apart, each containing 5–6 retinal cells. The cylindrical pharynx is located in the posterior half of the body and measures approximately 331–399 μm in length and 76–92 μm in width. The mouth opening is situated approximately one-fourth of the body's length from the posterior margin. Two large testes, measuring approximately 34–122 μm in width, are positioned anterior to the pharynx. The penis papilla is a long, slender cone curving in a distinct "U" shape. The ovaries, positioned behind the brain, are sickle-shaped and pear-shaped, measuring approximately 77–135 μm in length and 46–58 μm in width.
