= Oregoniplana opisthopora =

Scientific classification
- Domain: Eukaryota
- Kingdom: Animalia
- Phylum: Platyhelminthes
- Order: Tricladida
- Family: Cercyridae
- Genus: Oregoniplana
- Species: O. opisthopora

Binomial name
- Oregoniplana opisthopora Holmquist & Karling, 1972

Species of planarian

Oregoniplana opisthopora is a species of planarian in the family Cercyridae. Its type locality is Oregon.

== Description ==
Oregoniplana opisthopora is approximately 2 mm (0.079 in) in length and has a brownish-grey coloration. It lacks auricles, but possesses two eyes. Spots indicate the locations of its gonads, pharynx and copulatory bulb. Unicellular papillae are present along its body margin.
