= Cercyra =

- Cercyra hastata

Scientific classification
- Kingdom: Animalia
- Phylum: Platyhelminthes
- Order: Tricladida
- Family: Cercyridae
- Genus: Cercyra; Schmidt, 1862

Species
- see text

Genus of flatworms

Cercyra is a genus of triclad flatworms in the tribe Cercyrini of the family Cercyridae.

== Species ==
- Cercyra hastata Schmidt, 1862
- Cercyra teissieri Steinmann, 1930
