= Oregoniplana =

Scientific classification
- Domain: Eukaryota
- Kingdom: Animalia
- Phylum: Platyhelminthes
- Order: Tricladida
- Family: Cercyridae
- Genus: Oregoniplana; Holmquist & Karling, 1972

Species
- Oregoniplana geniculata Li & Wang, 2019; Oregoniplana opisthopora Holmquist & Karling, 1972; Oregoniplana pantherina Sluys, 1989

Genus of planarian

Oregoniplana is a genus of planarian in the family Cercyridae.
