= Stummeria =

Scientific classification
- Domain: Eukaryota
- Kingdom: Animalia
- Phylum: Platyhelminthes
- Order: Tricladida
- Family: Cercyridae
- Genus: Stummeria
- Species: S. marginata

Binomial name
- Stummeria marginata Bohmig, 1908

Genus of planarian

Stummeria is a genus of planarian in the family Cercyridae. It is monotypic, containing the sole species Stummeria marginata.

== Description ==
The genus Stummeria is described as having a slender body, with a narrow anterior and rounded posterior. It has no tentacles, and two eyes.
