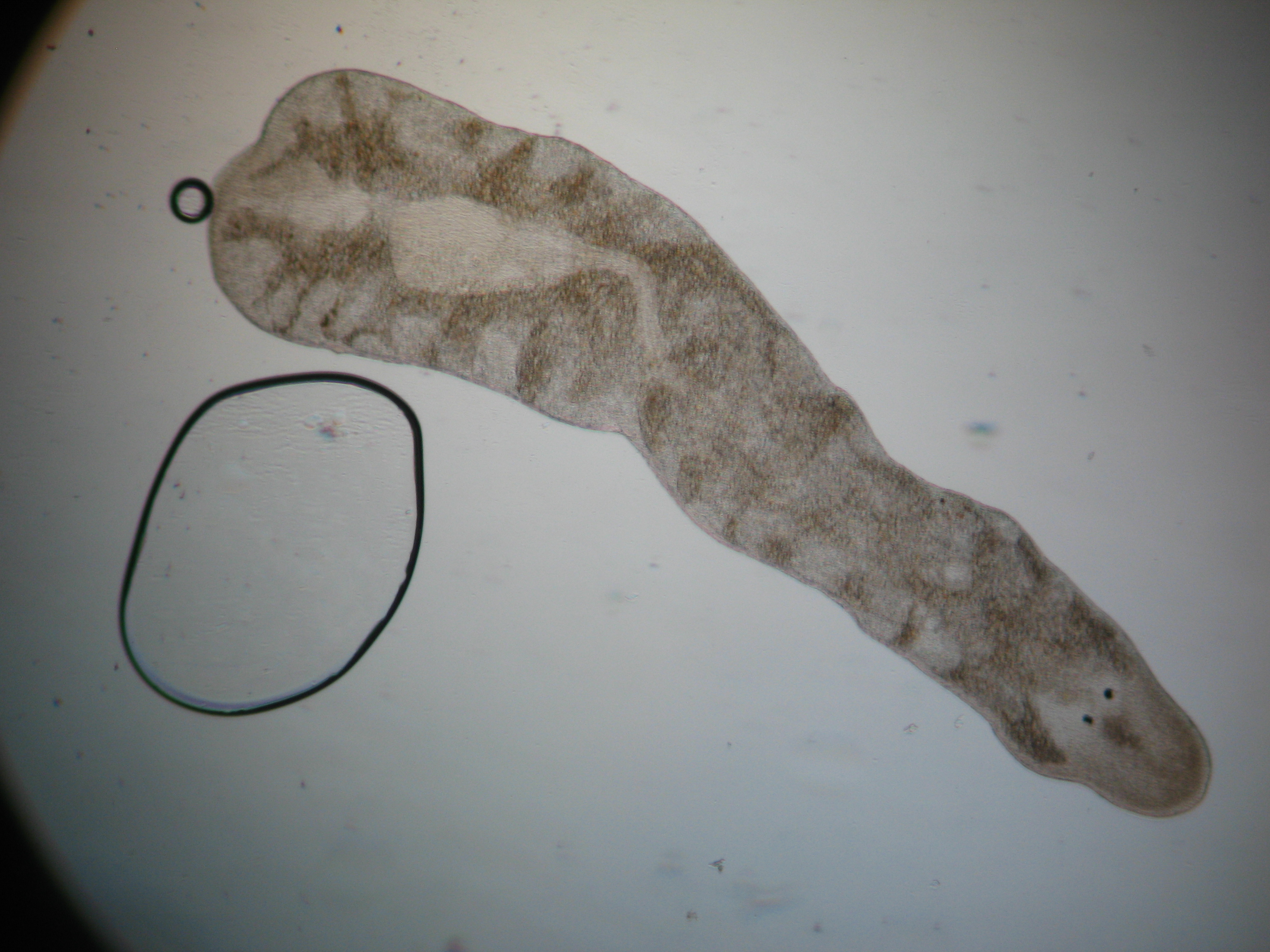
- Sabussowia ronaldi

Scientific classification
- Kingdom: Animalia
- Phylum: Platyhelminthes
- Order: Tricladida
- Family: Cercyridae
- Genus: Sabussowia; Bohmig, 1906

= Sabussowia =

Genus of flatworms

Sabussowia is a genus of flatworms belonging to the family Cercyridae.

The species of this genus are found in Europe and Northern America.

Species:

- Sabussowia dioica (Claparède, 1863)
- Sabussowia ronaldi Delogu & Curini Galletti, 2011
- Sabussowia wilhelmii Ball, 1973
