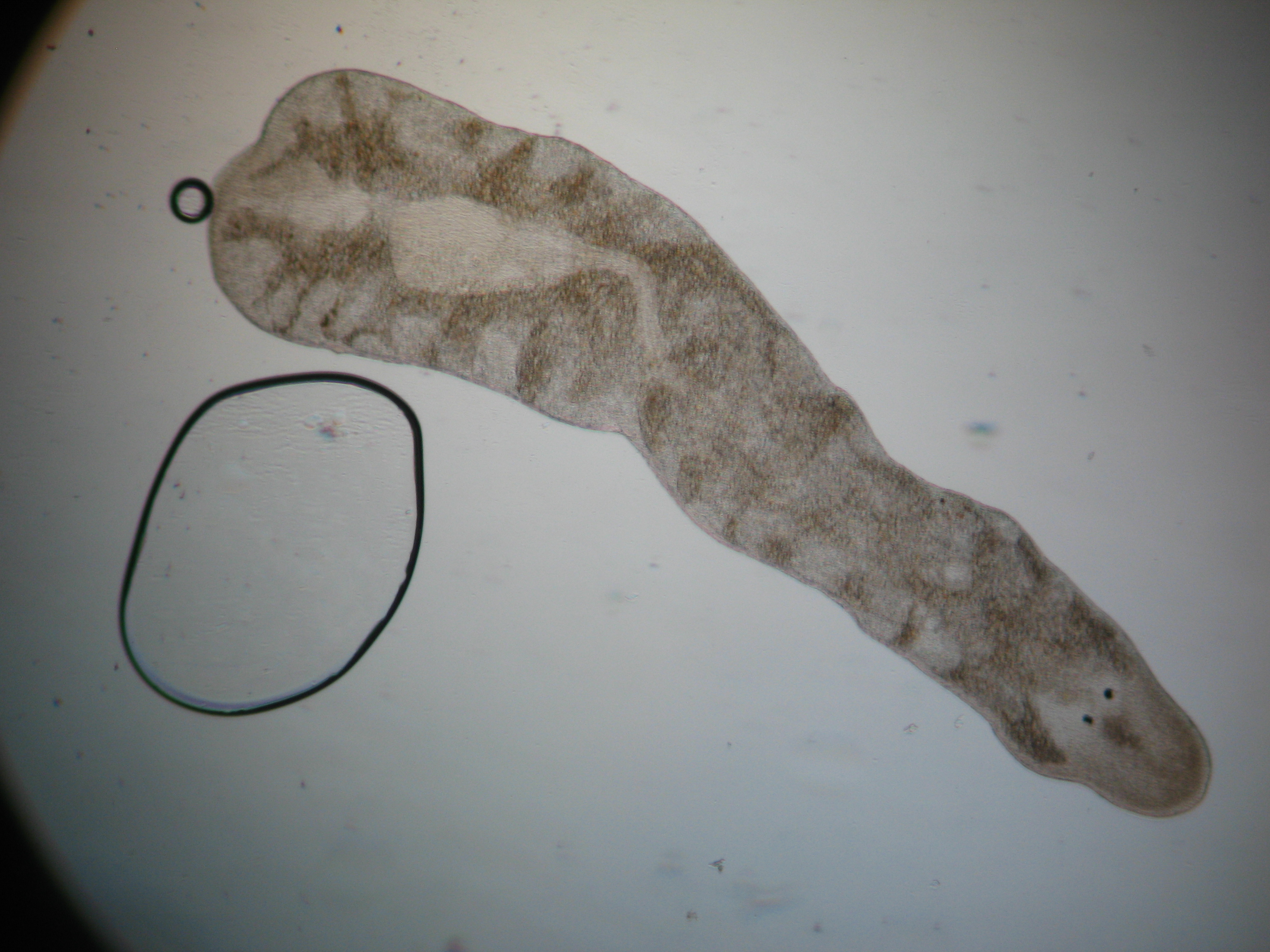
- Sabussowia ronaldi

Scientific classification
- Kingdom: Animalia
- Phylum: Platyhelminthes
- Order: Tricladida
- Superfamily: Cercyroidea
- Family: Cercyridae; Böhmig, 1906

Genera
- see text

= Cercyridae =

Family of flatworms

Cercyridae is a family of Maricola triclads.

== Taxonomy ==
List of known genera:

- Stummeria
- Oregoniplana
  - Tribe Cercyrini
    - Probursa
    - Pacifides
    - Puiteca
    - Cerbussowia
    - Sabussowia
    - Cercyra
