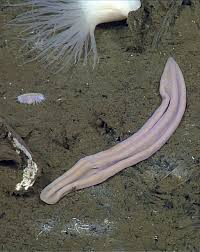
- A living X. profunda

Scientific classification
- Kingdom: Animalia
- Phylum: Xenacoelomorpha
- Family: Xenoturbellidae
- Genus: Xenoturbella
- Species: X. profunda

Binomial name
- Xenoturbella profunda Rouse, Wilson, Carvajal & Vrijenhoek, 2016

= Xenoturbella profunda =

Species of bilaterians with a simple body plan

Longitudinal section of a congeneric species, Xenoturbella bocki

Xenoturbella profunda, the purple sock or sock worm, is a marine, benthic, deep-water worm-like species that belongs to the family Xenoturbellidae. It was discovered in the eastern Pacific Ocean by a group of Californian and Australian scientists. The species was described in 2016 from seven specimens.

X. profunda shares morphological similarities with other species of the genus Xenoturbella and is known for lacking a respiratory, circulatory, and excretory system.

== Description ==
The etymology of the species name refers to the fact that it lives deepest of the known xenoturbellids.

Xenoturbella profunda individuals were sampled at ca. 3,700 m (12,100 ft) depth near a carbonate-hosted hydrothermal vent in the Gulf of California. This animal is 15 cm (5.9 in) in length, with a uniform pale pink colouration. The body wall displays several furrows: on the circumference, on the side, and two deep, longitudinal, dorsal ones. The longitudinal orientation involves a rounded anterior end, while the posterior end gradually reduces in thickness. The mouth is orientated ventrally, anterior to the ring furrow. The live specimens exhibited an epidermal ventral glandular network branching over two-thirds of the ventral surface. The species is gonochoric, and gametes are present dorsally and ventrally in the body wall. Tissues contain exogenous DNA corresponding to a bivalve mollusk, the vesicomyid Archivesica gigas.

== Phylogeny ==
Comparison of mitochondrial DNA and protein sequences showed that the species X. profunda is the sister group to X. churro. In turn, these two species share evolutionary affinities with X. monstrosa into a clade of 'deep-water' taxa.

Species-level cladogram of the genus Xenoturbella.

- Xenacoelomorpha
  - Acoelomorpha
  - Xenoturbella
    - 'Shallow' clade
      - X. japonica
      - - X. bocki
        - X. hollandorum
    - 'Deep' clade
      - X. monstrosa
      - - X. churro
        - X. profunda

The cladogram has been reconstructed from mitochondrial DNA and protein sequences.
