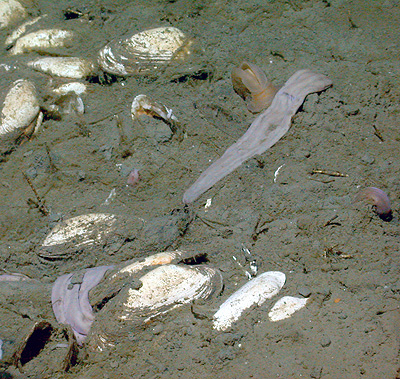
- A group of X. monstrosa

Scientific classification
- Kingdom: Animalia
- Phylum: Xenacoelomorpha
- Family: Xenoturbellidae
- Genus: Xenoturbella
- Species: X. monstrosa

Binomial name
- Xenoturbella monstrosa Rouse, Wilson, Carvajal & Vrijenhoek, 2016

= Xenoturbella monstrosa =

Species of bilaterians with a simple body plan

Longitudinal section of a congeneric species, Xenoturbella bocki

Xenoturbella monstrosa, a deep-sea giant purple sock worm, is a marine, benthic, deep-water worm-like species that belongs to the family Xenoturbellidae. It was discovered in the eastern Pacific Ocean by a group of Californian and Australian scientists. The species was described in 2016 from several specimens.

Xenoturbella monstrosa shares morphological similarities with other species of the genus Xenoturbella, and is known for lacking respiratory, circulatory, and an excretory system.

== Description ==
The etymology of the species name refers to its unusual large size among known xenoturbellids.

Xenoturbella monstrosa is 20 cm (7.9 in) in length, with a purple or pale pink colouration. The body wall displays several furrows: on the circumference, on the side, and two deep, longitudinal, dorsal ones. The longitudinal orientation involves a rounded anterior end in front of the ring furrow, while the posterior end gradually reduces in thickness. The mouth is orientated ventrally, halfway between the anterior end and the ring furrow. The live specimens exhibited an epidermal ventral glandular network branching over two-thirds of the ventral surface. Gametes are present dorsally and ventrally in the body wall. Tissues contain exogenous DNA corresponding to bivalve mollusks, the vesicomyid Archivesica diagonalis and Calyptogena pacifica.

== Phylogeny ==
Comparison of mitochondrial DNA and protein sequences showed that the species X. monstrosa is the sister group to X. churro and X. profunda in a clade of 'deep-water' taxa.

Species-level cladogram of the genus Xenoturbella.

- Xenacoelomorpha
  - Acoelomorpha
  - Xenoturbella
    - 'Shallow' clade
      - X. japonica
      - - X. bocki
        - X. hollandorum
    - 'Deep' clade
      - X. monstrosa
      - - X. churro
        - X. profunda

The cladogram has been reconstructed from mitochondrial DNA and protein sequences.
