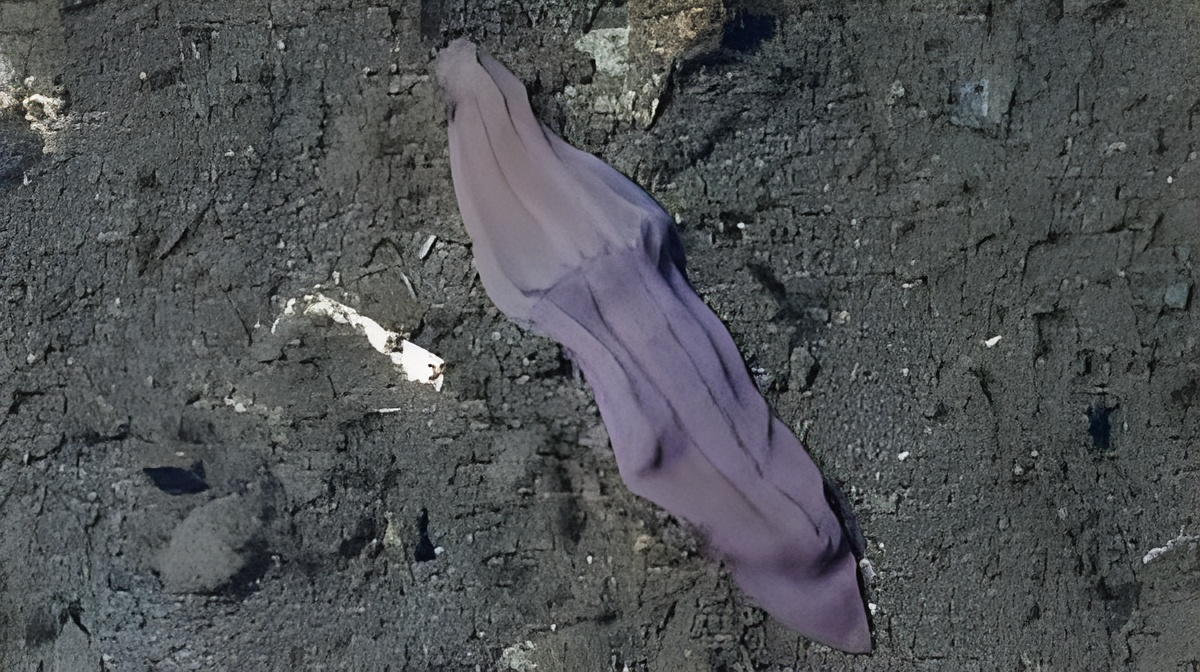
- A living X. churro

Scientific classification
- Kingdom: Animalia
- Phylum: Xenacoelomorpha
- Family: Xenoturbellidae
- Genus: Xenoturbella
- Species: X. churro

Binomial name
- Xenoturbella churro Rouse, Wilson, Carvajal & Vrijenhoek, 2016

= Xenoturbella churro =

Species of bilaterians with a simple body plan

Longitudinal section of a congeneric species, Xenoturbella bocki

Xenoturbella churro is a marine, benthic, deep-water worm-like species that belongs to the family Xenoturbellidae. It was discovered in the eastern Pacific Ocean by a group of Californian and Australian scientists. The species was described in 2016 from a single specimen.

X. churro shares morphological similarities with other species of the genus Xenoturbella and is known for lacking a respiratory, circulatory, and excretory system.

== Description ==
The etymology of the species name refers to the resemblance to churro, a fried-dough pastry.

This animal is 10 cm (3.9 in) in length, with a uniform orange/pink colouration. The body wall displays several furrows: on the circumference, on the side, and four deep, longitudinal, dorsal ones. The longitudinal orientation involves a rounded anterior end, while the posterior end sharply reduces in thickness. The mouth is orientated ventrally, halfway between the anterior end and the ring furrow. The live specimen exhibited an epidermal ventral glandular network branching over two-thirds of the ventral surface. Gametes are present dorsally and ventrally in the body wall. Tissues contain exogenous DNA corresponding to a bivalve mollusk, the vesicomyid Calyptogena pacifica.

== Phylogeny ==
Comparison of mitochondrial DNA and protein sequences showed that the species X. churro is the sister group to X. profunda. In turn, these two species share evolutionary affinities with X. monstrosa into a clade of 'deep-water' taxa.

Species-level cladogram of the genus Xenoturbella.

- Xenacoelomorpha
  - Acoelomorpha
  - Xenoturbella
    - 'Shallow' clade
      - X. japonica
      - - X. bocki
        - X. hollandorum
    - 'Deep' clade
      - X. monstrosa
      - - X. churro
        - X. profunda

The cladogram has been reconstructed from mitochondrial DNA and protein sequences.
