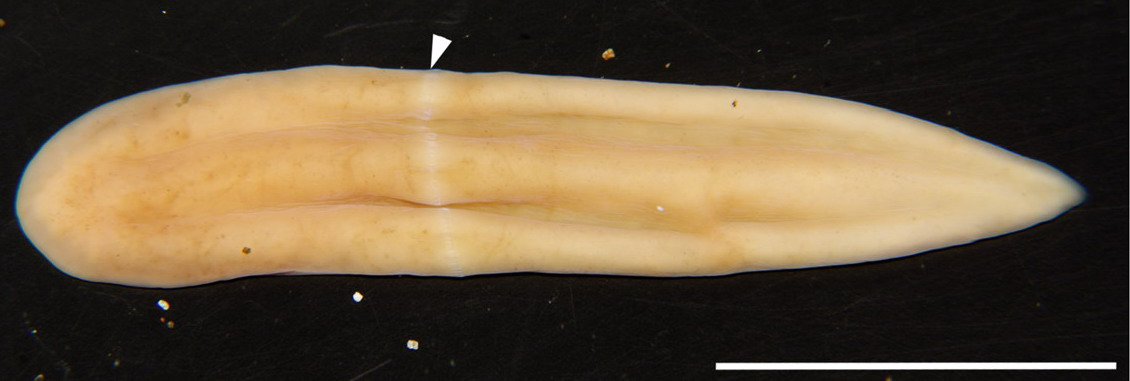
- X. japonica holotype female. The white arrowhead indicates the ring furrow.

Scientific classification
- Kingdom: Animalia
- Phylum: Xenacoelomorpha
- Family: Xenoturbellidae
- Genus: Xenoturbella
- Species: X. japonica

Binomial name
- Xenoturbella japonica Nakano, Miyazawa, Maeno, Shiroishi, Kakui, Koyanagi, Kanda, Satoh, Omori & Kohtsuka, 2018

= Xenoturbella japonica =

Species of bilaterians with a simple body plan

Longitudinal section of a congeneric species, Xenoturbella bocki

Xenoturbella japonica is a marine benthic worm-like species that belongs to the family Xenoturbellidae. It was discovered in the western Pacific Ocean by a group of Japanese scientists from the University of Tsukuba. The species was described in 2017 in a study published in the journal BMC Evolutionary Biology and amended in 2018.

Xenoturbella japonica is known for lacking respiratory, circulatory, and excretory systems.

== Description ==
The etymology of the species name corresponds to the locality where the specimens were sampled.

Xenoturbella japonica is 5.3 cm (2.1 in) in length, with a pale orange colouration. The body wall displays ring and side furrows. The mouth is orientated ventrally, just anterior to the ring furrow. The live specimen exhibits a conspicuous ventral epidermal glandular network. Tissues contain exogenous DNA corresponding to bivalve mollusks, the vesicomyid Acila castrensis, and Nucula nucleus.

== Phylogeny ==
Comparison of mitochondrial DNA and protein sequences showed that the species Xenoturbella japonica is the sister group to X. bocki and X. hollandorum in a clade of 'shallow-water' taxa.

Species-level cladogram of the genus Xenoturbella.

- Xenacoelomorpha
  - Acoelomorpha
  - Xenoturbella
    - 'Shallow' clade
      - X. japonica
      - - X. bocki
        - X. hollandorum
    - 'Deep' clade
      - X. monstrosa
      - - X. churro
        - X. profunda

The cladogram has been reconstructed from mitochondrial DNA and protein sequences.
