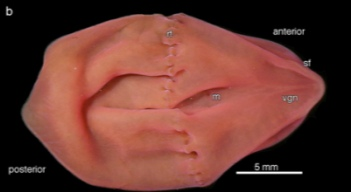
- An image of X. hollandorum

Scientific classification
- Kingdom: Animalia
- Phylum: Xenacoelomorpha
- Family: Xenoturbellidae
- Genus: Xenoturbella
- Species: X. hollandorum

Binomial name
- Xenoturbella hollandorum Rouse, Wilson, Carvajal & Vrijenhoek, 2016

= Xenoturbella hollandorum =

Species of bilaterians with a simple body plan

Longitudinal section of a congeneric species, Xenoturbella bocki

Xenoturbella hollandorum is a marine, benthic worm-like species that belongs to the family Xenoturbellidae. It was discovered in the eastern Pacific Ocean by a group of Californian and Australian scientists. The species was described in 2016.

X. hollandorum shares morphological similarities with other species of the genus Xenoturbella and is known for lacking a respiratory, circulatory, and excretory system.

== Description ==
The etymology of the species name corresponds to a scientific patronym in honor of Linda and Nicholas Holland.

Xenoturbella hollandorum is 2.5 cm (0.98 in) in length, with a uniform bright pink colouration. The body wall displays several furrows: on the circumference, on the side, and two deep, longitudinal, dorsal ones. The mouth is oriented ventrally, anterior to the ring furrow. The live specimen exhibits an inconspicuous epidermal ventral glandular network.

== Phylogeny ==
Comparison of mitochondrial DNA and protein sequences showed that the species X. hollandorum is the sister group to X. bocki. In turn, these two species share evolutionary affinities with X. japonica into a clade of 'shallow-water' taxa.

Species-level cladogram of the genus Xenoturbella.

- Xenacoelomorpha
  - Acoelomorpha
  - Xenoturbella
    - 'Shallow' clade
      - X. japonica
      - - X. bocki
        - X. hollandorum
    - 'Deep' clade
      - X. monstrosa
      - - X. churro
        - X. profunda

The cladogram has been reconstructed from mitochondrial DNA and protein sequences.
