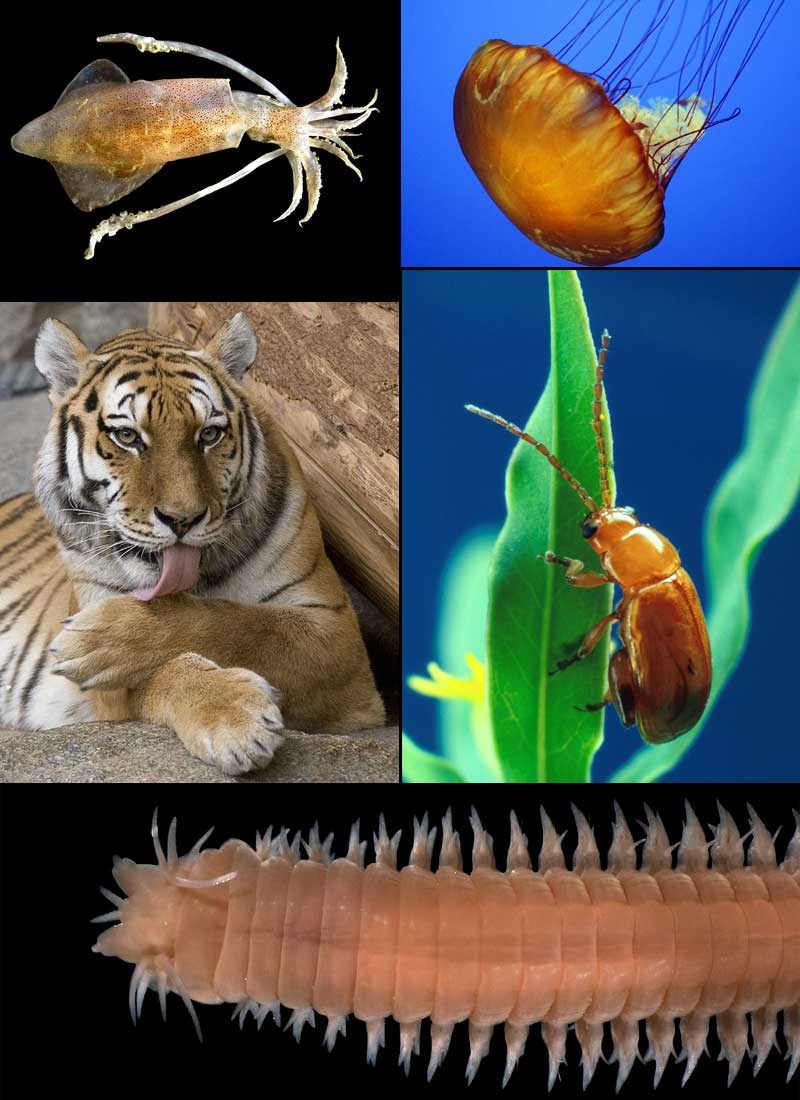
- Diversity of planulozoans

Scientific classification
- Kingdom: Animalia
- Subkingdom: Eumetazoa
- Clade: ParaHoxozoa
- Clade: Planulozoa; Wallberg et al., 2004

Phyla
- Cnidaria; Bilateria/Triploblasta; Proarticulata †?; Xenacoelomorpha; Kimberella†; Tullimonstrum†; Saccorhytida †; Nephrozoa (unranked); Superphylum Deuterostomia; Chordata(s.l); "Vetulicolia"†; Cephalochordata; Craniata; "Ambulacraria"; Hemichordata; Echinodermata; Cambroernida†; Vetulocystidae†; Protostomia (unranked); Superphylum Ecdysozoa; Spiralia (unranked); Placozoa?

= Planulozoa =

Planulozoa Temporal range: 600–0 Ma

Clade of animals

Planulozoa is a clade which includes the Cnidaria (corals and jellyfish) and the Bilateria (all the more complex animals including worms, insects and vertebrates). The designation Planulozoa may be considered a synonym to ParaHoxozoa. Within Planulozoa, the Placozoa may be a sister of Cnidaria to the exclusion of Bilateria. The clade excludes basal animals such as the Ctenophora (comb jellies), and Porifera (sponges). The placement of Placozoa as either a sister to Planulozoa or a sister to Cnidaria remains debated.

The phylogenetic tree indicates approximately how many millions of years ago (mya) the lineages split. Here, Planulozoa is shown sans Placozoa.

Planulozoa are associated with the emergence of the Zoc and ZF-NC gene domains.

- Choanozoa 950 mya
  - Choanoflagellata
  - Animalia 760 mya
    - Porifera
    - Eumetazoa Diploblasts
      - Ctenophora
      - ParaHoxozoa
        - Placozoa
        - Planulozoa 680 mya
          - Cnidaria
          - Bilateria Triploblasts
            - Xenacoelomorpha
            - Nephrozoa 650 mya
              - Deuterostomia
                - Ambulacraria
                - Chordata
              - Protostomia 610 mya
                - Ecdysozoa
                - Spiralia
