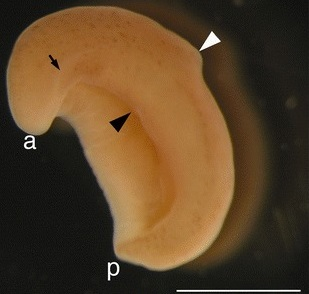
- X. bocki. Black arrow indicates side furrow. a is the anterior tip. p is the posterior tip. Black triangle indicates mouth. White triangle indicates circumferential furrow. The scale bar in the bottom right is 1 cm.

Scientific classification
- Kingdom: Animalia
- Phylum: Xenacoelomorpha
- Family: Xenoturbellidae
- Genus: Xenoturbella
- Species: X. bocki

Binomial name
- Xenoturbella bocki Westblad, 1949

= Xenoturbella bocki =

Species of bilaterians with a simple body plan

Xenoturbella bocki is a marine benthic worm-like species from the genus Xenoturbella. It is found in saltwater sea floor habitats off the coast of Europe, predominantly in Sweden. It was the first species in the genus discovered. Initially, it was collected by Swedish zoologist Sixten Bock in 1915 and described in 1949 by Swedish zoologist Einar Westblad. The unusual digestive structure of this species, in which a single opening is used to eat food and excrete waste, has led to considerable study and controversy as to its classification. It is a bottom-dwelling, burrowing carnivore that eats mollusks (likely larval forms, as opposed to hard-shelled adults).

== Systematics ==
=== Etymology ===
For the genus name Xenoturbella, Ancient Greek xénos means foreign or strange, and Latin turbela means a bustle or turbulence in water. Genus Xenoturbella is a member of the sub-phylum Xenoturbellida, which are known as paradoxmaskar – Swedish for "paradox worms" (a term that some popular media have applied to the species), because if it is classified as a deuterostome, it would be more closely related to humans than other, more complex, invertebrates such as lobsters. Deuterostomes are a superphylum of animals whose anus forms before their mouth does during embryonic development. It includes humans, other chordates, echinoderms, and hemichordates.

The species signifier bocki refers to Sixten Bock, who first collected the organism in 1915. It was assigned by Swedish zoologist Einar Westblad, who described the species in 1949.

=== Taxonomy ===
In 1999, examination of X. bocki specimens held at the Swedish Museum of Natural History showed that a small subset of them must belong to another species. This population differed from specimens identified as X. bocki in internal fertilization, its small size of 12 mm (0.47 in) at most, and its pink coloration, in contrast to the yellow-white coloration identified for X. bocki. The new taxon was named after Westblad, who collected the specimens from coarser and shallower habitats in the same range as X. bocki. However, mitochondrial DNA sequencing from the specimens identified with both species suggests that the two populations belonged to the same species, involving that X. westbladi is a junior synonym of X. bocki.

== Phylogeny ==
=== Species level ===
Comparison of mitochondrial DNA and protein sequences showed that the species Xenoturbella bocki – often found off the coast of Sweden – is the sister group to X. hollandorum, a species discovered in 2016 in the eastern Pacific Ocean. In turn, these two species share evolutionary affinities with X. japonica into a clade of 'shallow-water' taxa.

Species-level cladogram of the genus Xenoturbella.

- Xenacoelomorpha
  - Acoelomorpha
  - Xenoturbella
    - 'Shallow' clade
      - X. japonica
      - - X. bocki
        - X. hollandorum
    - 'Deep' clade
      - X. monstrosa
      - - X. churro
        - X. profunda

The cladogram has been reconstructed from mitochondrial DNA and protein sequences.

=== Above the genus level ===
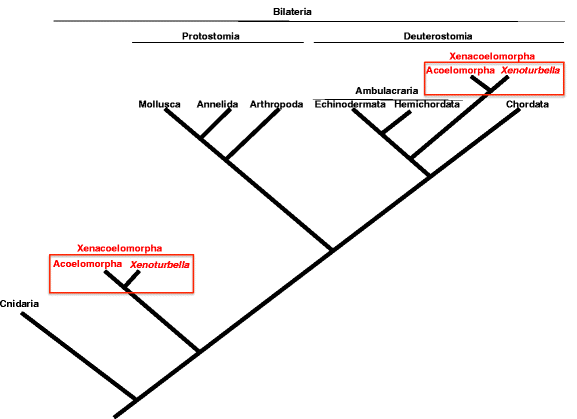
The two competing hypotheses as to the phylogeny of Xenoturbella are shown in red. One suggests it is a deuterostome (right), while the other suggests it is a basal bilaterian (left).

When it was discovered, X. bocki was placed in a new genus, Xenoturbella. Above the genus level, the classification of this animal is controversial. Westbald placed it in the phylum Platyhelminthes in the class Turbellaria (free-living flatworms). In 1999, based on genetic analysis, it was placed in Protostomia by Israelsson and grouped with the bivalves. Protostomia is a large clade including worms, mollusks, and arthropods. In embryonic development, their mouth develops prior to the development of the anus for most protostomes, though some have evolved other developmental pathways. If placed in this clade, Xenoturbella would also be among these exceptions.

However, today, this is understood as a misclassification due to contaminating DNA from its shellfish food. Swedish scientist Sarah J. Bourlat and her coauthors in 2006 placed it in its own phylum, Xenoturbellida. More recent studies suggest, on the basis of genetic and developmental evidence (e.g., Hox genes), that it should be grouped with Acoela and Nemertodermatida into Acoelomorpha. These three taxa are sometimes placed within the deuterostomes (a large clade that includes humans and other chordates, sea stars and others), while others classify these organisms as a basal offshoot that resembles a common ancestor of deuterostomes and protostomes. A 2016 analysis of many genetic data sets supports the latter, and suggests that, like Xenoturbella bocki, the common ancestor of protostomes and deuterostomes likely had one opening, ciliated locomotion, and a wormlike body. However, if the deuterostome hypothesis is correct, then Xenoturbella must have lost many ancestral traits, such as an anus.

== Description ==
Diagram of a longitudinal section of X. bocki

This animal usually grows to 1 cm (0.39 in) in length, though individuals as long as 4 cm (1.6 in) have been reported. Its nervous system consists of a nerve net with no defined brain or ganglia. The nerve net is found on the basal (away from the animal's surface) side of the skin. This animal lacks a coelom. It also lacks an anus, excreting waste through the same opening as it intakes food. Thus, the digestive organ is sac-like. The opening is on the belly of the animal, near the front. The animal is simultaneously hermaphroditic.

A furrow runs along the circumference of the body in the middle of the animal. There are also side furrows. On its sides, numerous tiny cilia aid in locomotion. Small cells contain vesicles that may act as glands. An organ of unknown function, preliminarily called a statocyst, has been observed on the front end of the animal. Two leading hypotheses are that it aids in balance, as statocysts do in other invertebrates, or that it has endocrine functions. Experiments in which the animal was observed to cleave into two after a wound show that the statocyst is essential for normal behavior and long-term survival.

== Ecology ==
The animal moves through the water via rhythmic muscle contraction, aided by its side cilia, and a tuft of longer cilia on its back. The organism can also use its musculature to roll up into a ball and maintain that form for several months. Adults are known to have a symbiotic relationship with Chlamydiae and Gammaproteobacteria, two bacterial endosymbionts found in their gastrodermis. Genetic data confirms that its diet includes bivalve mollusks. However, it has never been observed feeding, so it is unknown if it eats bivalve carcasses, eggs, sperm, mucus, feces, or live larval or adult bivalves. It lacks any visible means to get through the shells of adult bivalves. Captive specimens survived for several months without food and showed no interest in any of the proposed food items afterwards. This has led some to suggest that it feeds by absorbing dissolved organic matter through its skin. At least one specimen that has been proposed to show a consumed bivalve larva is preserved in the Swedish Natural History Museum. This species burrows and has been observed to make tunnels as deep as 15 cm (5.9 in) into substrate in a laboratory aquarium.

== Range ==
This species has been found in ocean habitats off the coast of Europe, most often off the coast of Sweden. It is often collected using a Warén’s dredge from mud on the sea floor, at depths of 50–200 m (160–660 ft).

== Reproduction ==
X. bocki has only been observed to reproduce sexually. In the wild, this species spawns in the winter. It lays small, mucus-coated eggs, which sink in the water column. The eggs have a pale-orange color and are opaque. Young, upon hatching, are yellowish, nearly spherical, and move to the surface of the water. Larvae lack a blastopore and do not feed until they are fully developed. They may derive nourishment from the yolk, which would make them lecithotrophic. Within five days, muscular contractions are observed in a laboratory setting, which may aid locomotion. X. bocki is a direct developer. As of 2013, this animal is extremely challenging to grow in captivity.
