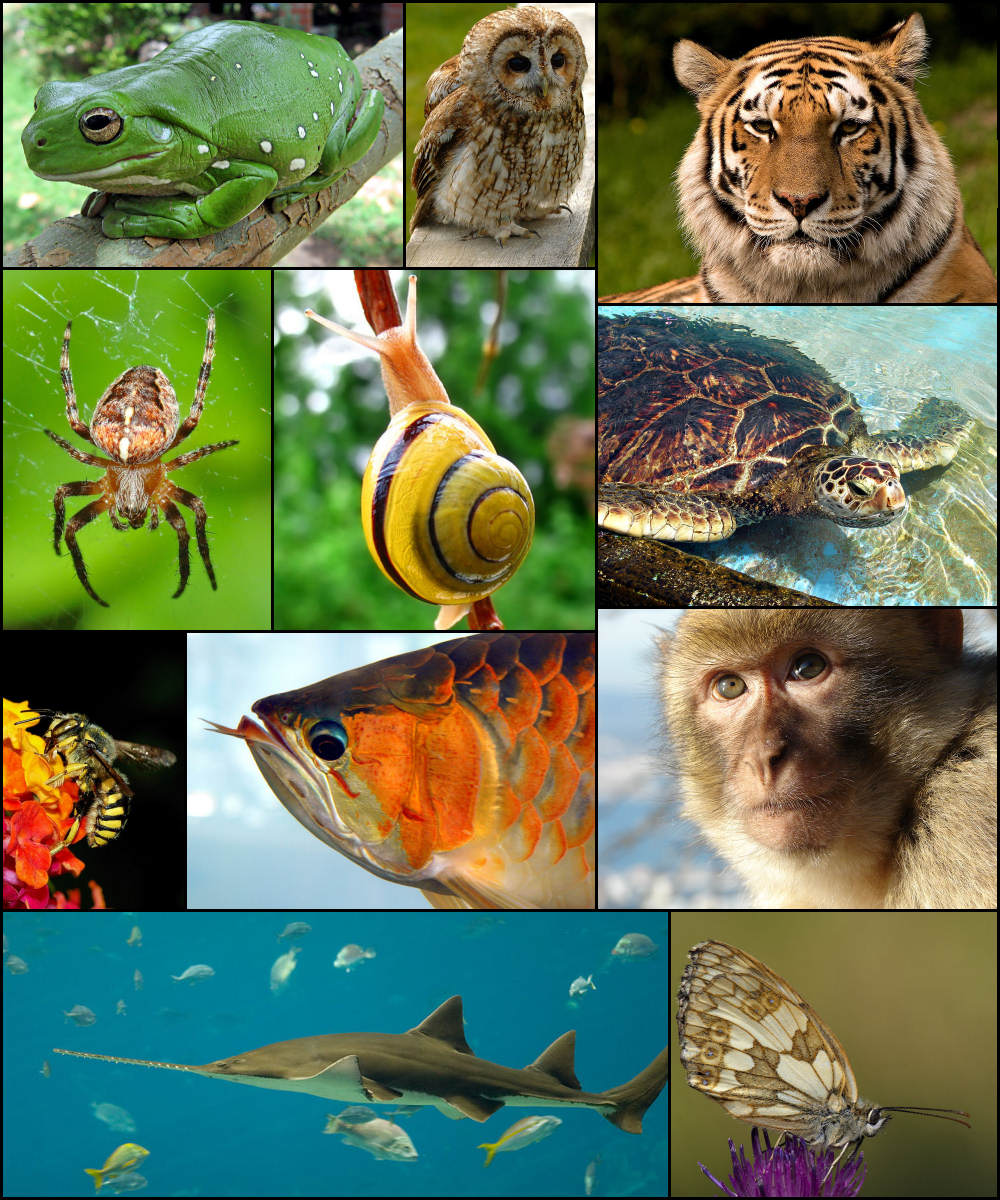
- Diversity of centroneuralians, showcasing vertebrates (Chordata), mollusks (Protostomia, Spiralia) and arthropods (Protostomia, Ecdysozoa)

Scientific classification
- Kingdom: Animalia
- Subkingdom: Eumetazoa
- Clade: ParaHoxozoa
- Clade: Bilateria
- Clade: Centroneuralia; Telford, 2021

Clades
- Chordata; Protostomia; †Kimberella; Ecdysozoa; Spiralia

= Centroneuralia =

Centroneuralia Temporal range: Ediacaran - Recent

Animal clade containing chordates and protostomes

Centroneuralia is a proposed clade of animals with bilateral symmetry as an embryo, consisting of the Chordata and Protostomia, united by the presence of a central nervous system. An alternative to the traditional protostome-deuterostome dichotomy, it has found weak support in several studies. Under this hypothesis, Centroneuralia would be sister to Xenambulacraria (Xenacoelomorpha + Ambulacraria) at the base of Bilateria.

Centroneuralia, as a proposed clade, originates in phylogenomics. More precisely, recent studies correlate support for Deuterostomia with simpler, site-homogeneous models, while more sophisticated and site-heterogeneous models recover Centroneuralia more often.

== Phylogeny ==
- Bilateria
  - Xenambulacraria
    - Xenacoelomorpha
    - Ambulacraria
  - Centroneuralia
    - Chordata
    - Protostomia
      - Ecdysozoa
      - Spiralia
      - †Kimberella
