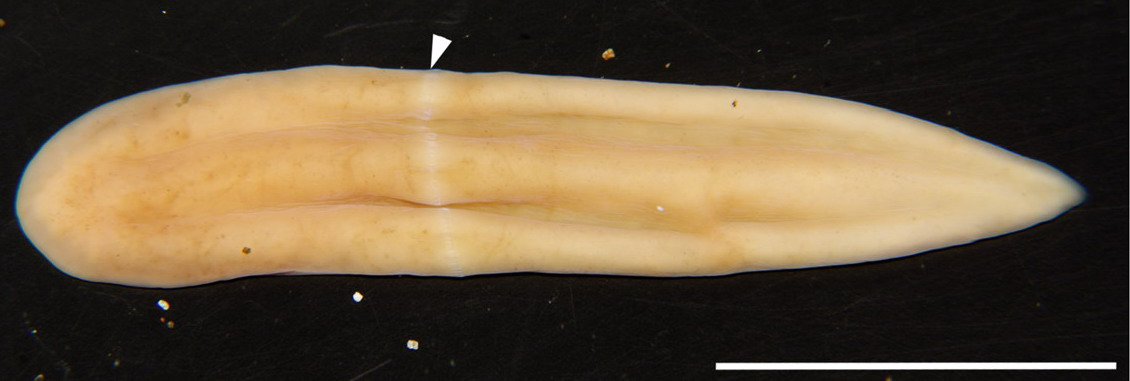
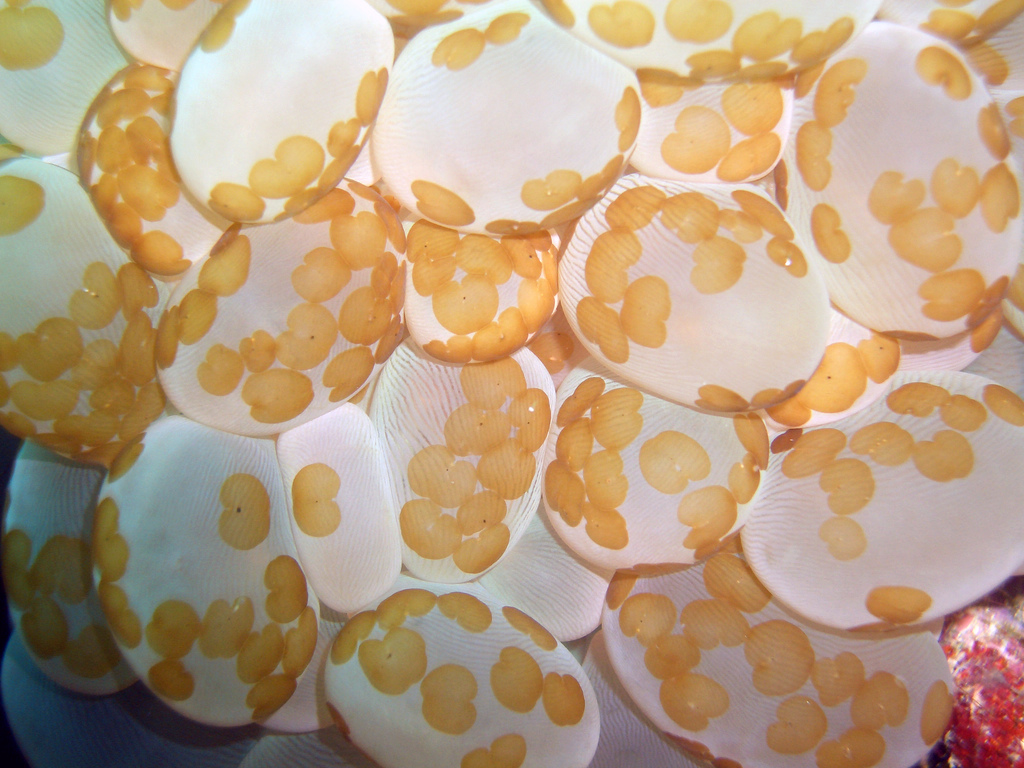
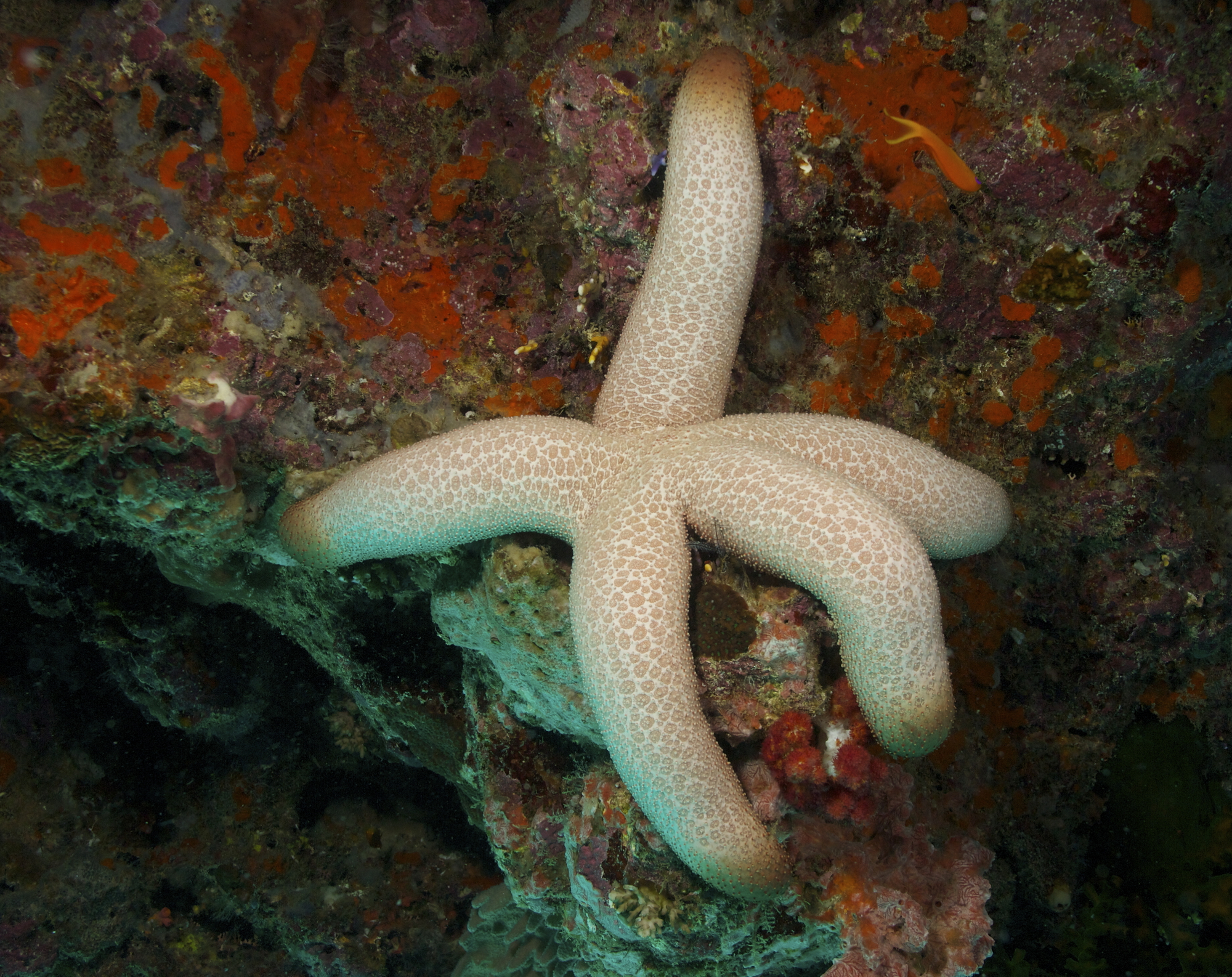
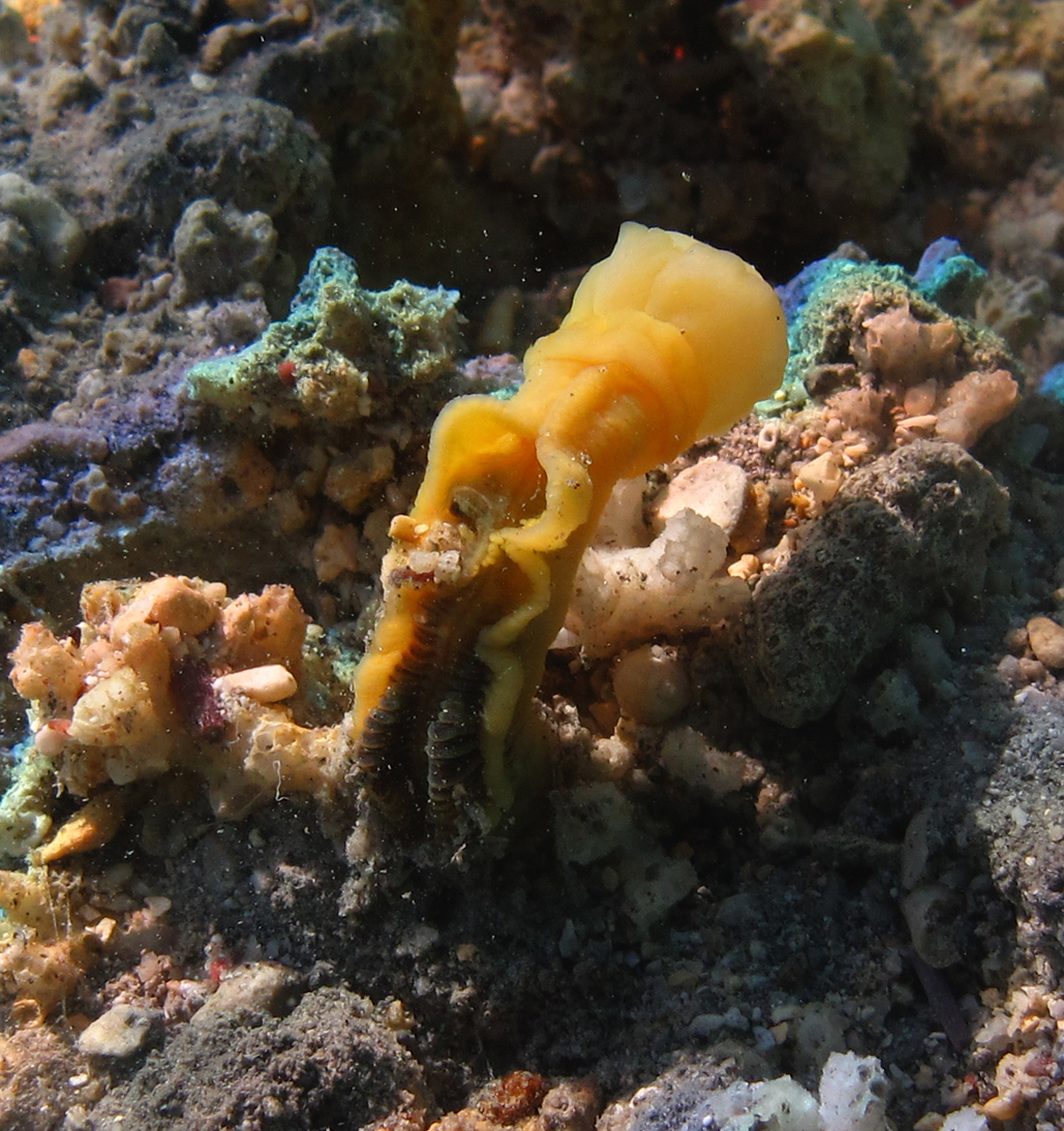
- Xenoturbellida (Xenoturbella japonica) Acoelomorpha (Waminoa sp.) Echinodermata (Thromidia catalai) Hemichordata (Balanoglossus sp.)
- Examples of all four branches of Xenambulacraria

Scientific classification
- Kingdom: Animalia
- Subkingdom: Eumetazoa
- Clade: ParaHoxozoa
- Clade: Bilateria
- (unranked): Xenambulacraria; Bourlat et al, 2006

Clades
- Xenacoelomorpha; Xenoturbellida; Acoelomorpha; Ambulacraria; Echinodermata; Hemichordata

= Xenambulacraria =

Xenambulacraria Temporal range: Cambrian–Present

Animal clade containing xenoturbellids, acoelomorphs, echinoderms and hemichordates

Xenambulacraria is a proposed clade of animals with bilateral symmetry as an embryo, consisting of the Xenacoelomorpha (i.e., Xenoturbella and acoelomorphs) and the Ambulacraria (i.e., echinoderms and hemichordates).

If confirmed, the clade would either be the sister group to the chordates (if deuterostomes are monophyletic) or the sister group to all the other bilaterians, grouped together in Centroneuralia (with deuterostomes being paraphyletic).

Although the validity of the clade relies mostly on phylogenomics, molecular genetics studies have proposed pigment cell clusters expressing polyketide synthase (PKS) and sulfotransferase as a synapomorphy of Xenambulacraria.

== Phylogeny ==
Xenambulacraria has usually been recovered as a clade inside of either of two distinct phylogenies.

=== Basal Xenambulacraria ===
The following phylogeny assumes a paraphyletic Deuterostomia, with Xenambulacraria at the base of Bilateria.

- Bilateria
  - Xenambulacraria
    - Xenacoelomorpha
      - Xenoturbellida
      - Acoelomorpha
    - Ambulacraria
      - Echinodermata
      - Hemichordata
  - Centroneuralia
    - Chordata
    - Protostomia
      - Ecdysozoa
      - Spiralia
      - †Kimberella

=== Xenambulacraria inside Deuterostomia ===
The following phylogeny assumes a monophyletic Deuterostomia, with Xenambulacraria nested inside of it.

- Bilateria
  - Deuterostomia
    - Xenambulacraria
      - Xenacoelomorpha
        - Xenoturbellida
        - Acoelomorpha
      - Ambulacraria
        - Echinodermata
        - Hemichordata
    - Chordata
  - Protostomia
    - Ecdysozoa
    - Spiralia
    - †Kimberella

== Gallery ==
Diversity of Xenambulacrarians

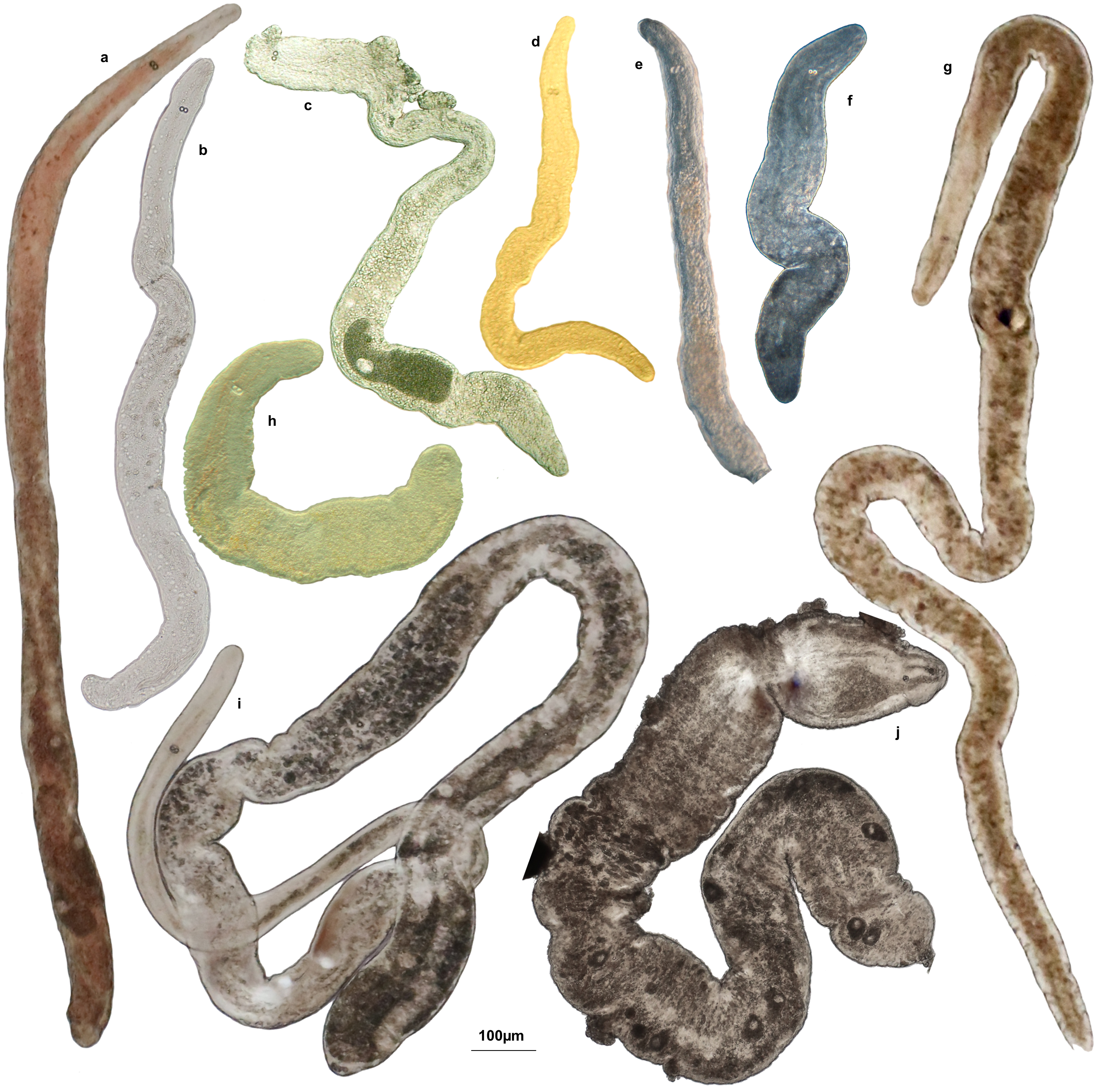
Various Acoelomorpha (nemertodermatids).

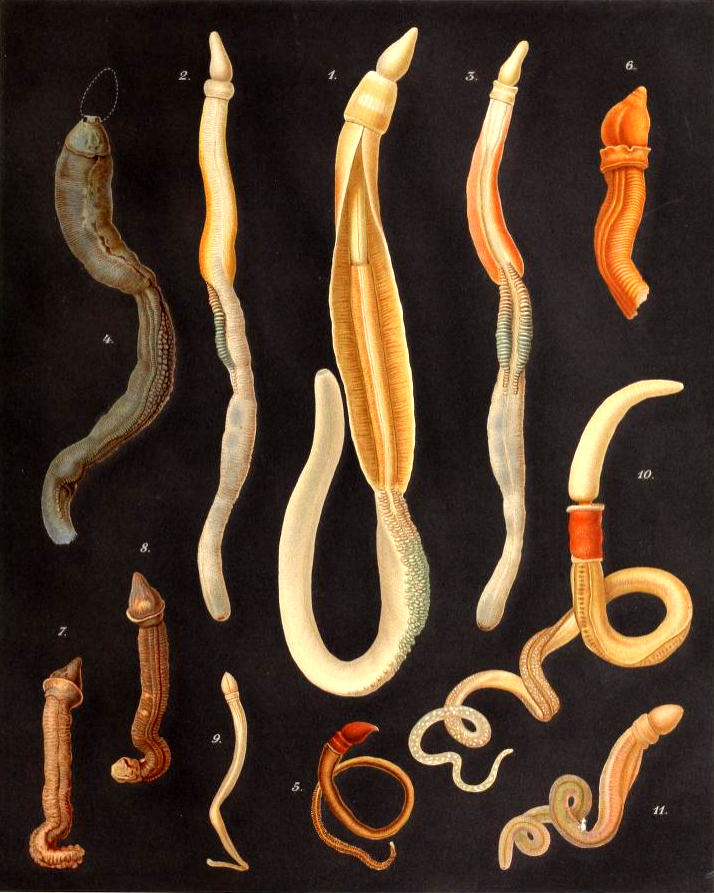
Various Hemichordata (enteropneusts).

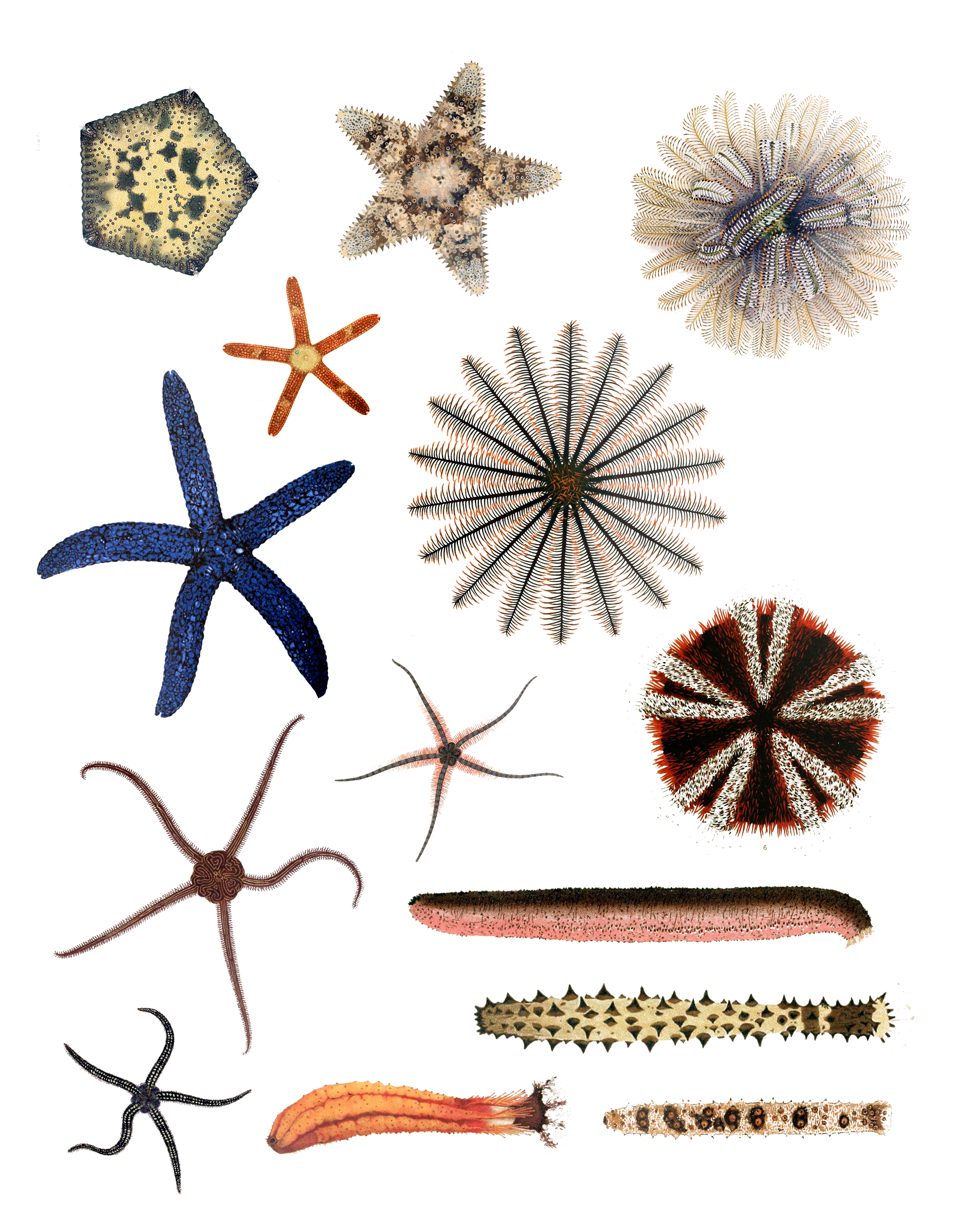
Various Echinodermata from all extant classes.
