= Neuralia =

Neuralia can refer to:

- Neuralia (animal), the clade containing Cnidaria, Ctenophora and Bilateria
