= Hesiolicium =

Scientific classification
- Domain: Eukaryota
- Kingdom: Animalia
- Phylum: Xenacoelomorpha
- Order: Acoela
- Family: Paratomellidae
- Genus: Hesiolicium; Crezee & Tyler, 1976

Genus of acoels

Hesiolicium is a genus of acoels belonging to the family Paratomellidae.

Species:

- Hesiolicium inops Crezee & Tyler, 1976
