= Sperm-mediated gene transfer =

Molecular biology technique

Sperm-mediated gene transfer (SMGT) is a transgenic technique that transfers genes based on the ability of sperm cells to spontaneously bind to and internalize exogenous DNA and transport it into an oocyte during fertilization to produce genetically modified animals.^{1} Exogenous DNA refers to DNA that originates outside of the organism. Transgenic animals have been obtained using SMGT, but the efficiency of this technique is low. Low efficiency is mainly due to low uptake of exogenous DNA by the spermatozoa, reducing the chances of fertilizing the oocytes with transfected spermatozoa.^{2} In order to successfully produce transgenic animals by SMGT, the spermatozoa must attach the exogenous DNA into the head and these transfected spermatozoa must maintain their functionality to fertilize the oocyte.^{2} Genetically modified animals produced by SMGT are useful for research in biomedical, agricultural, and veterinary fields of study. SMGT could also be useful in generating animals as models for human diseases or lead to future discoveries relating to human gene therapy.

== Sperm-Mediated Gene Transfer Mechanism ==
The method for SMGT uses the sperm cell, a natural vector of genetic material, to transport exogenous DNA. The exogenous DNA molecules bind to the cell membrane of the head of the sperm cell. This binding and internalization of the DNA is not a random event. The exogenous DNA interacts with the DNA-binding proteins (DBPs) that are present on the surface of the sperm cell.^{3} Spermatozoa are naturally protected against the intrusion of exogenous DNA molecules by an inhibitory factor present in mammals’ seminal fluid. This factor blocks the binding of sperm cells and exogenous DNA because in the presence of the inhibitory factor, DBPs lose their ability to bind to exogenous DNA. In the absence of this inhibitory factor, DBPs on sperm cells are able to interact with DNA and can then translocate the DNA into the cell. Therefore, the seminal fluid must be removed from the sperm samples by extensive washing immediately after ejaculation.^{3} After the DNA is internalized, the exogenous DNA must be integrated into the genome. There are various mechanisms suggested for DNA integration, including integrating DNA at oocyte activation, at nucleus decondensation, or at the formation of the pronuclei, but all of these suggested mechanisms imply that the integration of DNA happens after the penetration of the sperm cell into the oocyte.^{3}

== Sperm-Mediated Gene Transfer Controversy ==
Sperm-mediated gene transfer is considered controversial because despite the successes, it has not yet become established as a reliable form of genetic manipulation. Skepticism arises based on the assumption that evolutionary chaos could arise if sperm cells could act as vectors for exogenous DNA.^{4} Reasonable assumption tells us that because reproductive tracts contain free DNA molecules, sperm cells should be highly resistant to the risk of picking up exogenous DNA molecules. SMGT has been demonstrated experimentally and followed the assumption that nature has barriers against SMGT. These barriers are not always absolute and could explain the inconsistent experimental outcomes of SMGT.^{4} If there are natural barriers against SMGT, then the successes may only represent unusual cases in which the barriers failed. Two barriers have been identified; the inhibitory factor in seminal fluid that prevents binding to foreign DNA molecules and a sperm endogenous nuclease activity that is triggered upon interaction of sperm cells with foreign DNA molecules.^{4} These protections give reason to believe that unintentional interactions between sperm and exogenous genetic sequences is kept to a minimal. These barriers allow for protection against the threat that every fertilization event could become a potentially mutagenic one.^{4}

== Applications of Sperm-Mediated Gene Transfer ==
=== Animal Transgenesis ===
Transgenic animals have been produced successfully using gene transfer techniques such as sperm-mediated gene transfer. Though this production has been successful, the efficiency of the process is low. Low efficiency of SMGT in the production of transgenic animals is mainly due to poor uptake of the exogenous DNA by the sperm cells, thus reducing the number of fertilized oocytes with transfected spermatozoa.^{5} From 1989 to 2004, there were over 30 claims for the production of viable transgenic animals using SMGT, but only about 25 percent of these demonstrated a transmission of the transgenes beyond the F_{0} generation.^{4} This transmission is required in order to claim usable animal transgenesis. According to previous studies, numerous animal species, including mammals, birds, insects, and fish, have been found susceptible to SMGT techniques, thus indicating that SMGT has broad applicability across a wide variety of Metazoan species.^{4} Currently, despite the low frequency of transmission of transgenes, the frequency of phenotype modifications and overall animal transgenesis has been as high as 80 percent in some experiments.^{4}

=== Gene Therapy ===
The potential use of sperm-mediated gene transfer for embryo somatic gene therapy is a possibility for future research. Embryo somatic gene therapy would be advantageous because there seems to be an inverse correlation between the age of the patient and the effectiveness of gene therapy. Therefore, the possibility of gene therapy treatment before irreversible damage occurs would be ideal.^{4} A majority of the experiments that report successful SMGT provide evidence of post-fertilization transfer and maintenance of transgenes.^{6} SMGT has potential advantages of being a simple and cost-effective method of gene therapy, especially in contrast with pronuclear microinjection, another transgenic technique. Nevertheless, despite some successes and its potential utility, SMGT is not yet established as a reliable form of genetic modification.^{6}
