= Paratomellidae =

Scientific classification
- Domain: Eukaryota
- Kingdom: Animalia
- Phylum: Xenacoelomorpha
- Order: Acoela
- Family: Paratomellidae; Dörjes, 1966

Family of acoels

Paratomellidae is a family of acoels.

== Taxonomy ==
=== Genera ===
There are two genera recognised in the family Paratomellidae.

- Hesiolicium Crezee & Tyler, 1976
- Paratomella Dörjes, 1966

=== Species ===
There are three species recognised in the family Paratomellidae.

| Name | Image | Distribution | Description |
|---|---|---|---|
| Hesiolicium inops Crezee & Tyler 1976 | | | |
| Paratomella rubra Rieger & Ott 1971 | | | |
| Paratomella unichaeta Dörjes 1966 | | | |
