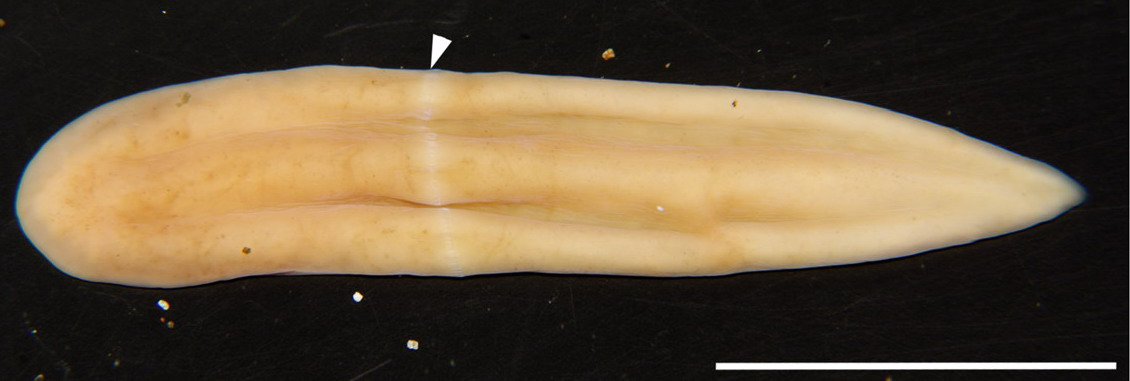
- Xenoturbella japonica. The white arrowhead indicates the ring furrow.
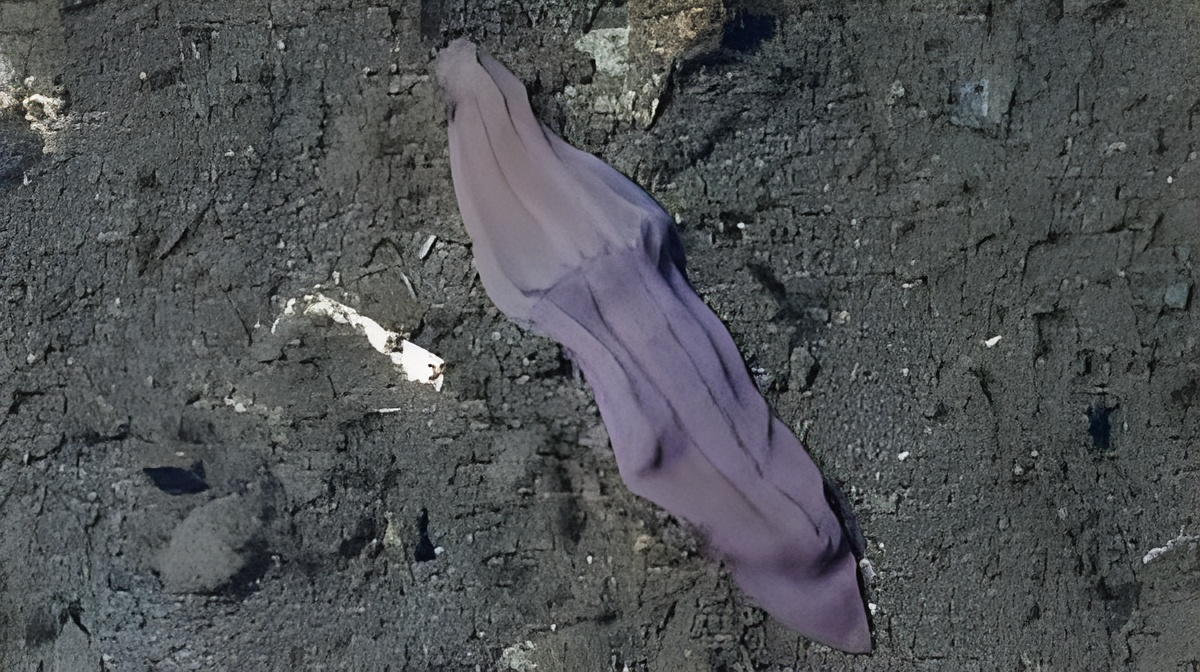
- Xenoturbella churro. A deep sea Xenoturbellid.

Scientific classification
- Kingdom: Animalia
- Phylum: Xenacoelomorpha
- Subphylum: Xenoturbellida; Bourlat et al., 2006
- Family: Xenoturbellidae; Westblad, 1949
- Genus: Xenoturbella; Westblad, 1949

Species
- See text

= Xenoturbella =

Genus of bilaterians with a simple body plan

Xenoturbella is a genus of very simple bilaterians whose relation to other animal groups is unclear. It contains a small number of marine benthic species that look like worms. They can be up to 20 centimetres (7.9 in) long.

== History ==
The first known species (Xenoturbella bocki) was collected in 1878 and 1879 from the Gullmar fjord on the Swedish west coast by August Malm and is stored in the collection of the Gothenburg Natural History Museum. A specimen is on display in the exhibition. It was collected again from the Gullmar fjord in 1915 by Sixten Bock, but it was only properly described in 1949 by Einar Westblad. These specimens are kept at the Swedish Museum of Natural History in Stockholm.

== Description ==
Xenoturbella bockii longitudinal section

Xenoturbella has a very simple body plan. It consists of a dorsoventrally flattened acoelomate body, with a ventral furrow on each side running down from the anterior tip until it is stopped by an anterior circumferential furrow. It shows two ciliated epithelial layers: an external epidermis and an internal gastrodermis lining the simple sac-like gut. The epidermis and gastrodermis are separated by a thick and multilayered basement membrane, the "subepidermal membrane complex", a major part of the extracellular matrix. The multiciliate epidermis displays unique interconnected ciliary rootlets and a mode of withdrawal and resorption of worn epidermal cells. The mouth is a mid-ventral pore leading to a gastral cavity, and there is no anus: waste is dispelled through the same opening as food is taken in.

The nervous system is composed of a net of interconnected neurons beneath the epidermis, without any concentration of neurons forming ganglia or nerve cords.

Species of Xenoturbella also lack a respiratory, circulatory, and excretory system. In fact, there are no defined organs, except for an anterior statocyst containing flagellated cells and a frontal pore organ. There are no organized gonads, but gametes are produced. Adults producing sperm are very rarely observed, but eggs and embryos are known to occur in follicles.

Research on the species Xenoturbella bocki has shown it to have external fertilization, with eggs and sperm being released from new openings in the body wall. Gametes released into the water through ruptures also occur in Xenoturbella's closest relatives, the acoels and nemertodermatids. No examples of hermaphroditism were reported.

Eggs of Xenoturbella are 0.2 millimetres (0.0079 in) wide, pale orange, and opaque. Newly hatched embryos are free-swimming (tending to stay close to the water surface) and ciliated. They feature no mouth, and they do not apparently feed. They are similar to the juveniles of the acoelomate Neochildia fusca.

In 2016, a large Xenoturbella monstrosa was found that was 20 centimetres (7.9 in) long.

== Systematics ==
=== Etymology ===
The term Xenoturbella derives from the Ancient Greek word ξένος (xénos), meaning "strange, unusual", and from the Latin word turbella meaning "stir, bustle". This refers to the enigmatic, unusual taxonomic status of the animal, initially considered as related to turbellarians, a group of flatworms whose aquatic species stir microscopic particles close to their ciliated epidermis.

=== Taxonomy ===
Currently, the genus Xenoturbella contains six recognized species:

- Xenoturbella bocki Westblad, 1949 [Xenoturbella westbladi Israelsson, 1999]
- Xenoturbella churro Rouse, Wilson, Carvajal & Vrijenhoek, 2016
- Xenoturbella hollandorum Rouse, Wilson, Carvajal & Vrijenhoek, 2016
- Xenoturbella japonica Nakano, 2017
- Xenoturbella monstrosa Rouse, Wilson, Carvajal & Vrijenhoek, 2016
- Xenoturbella profunda Rouse, Wilson, Carvajal & Vrijenhoek, 2016

== Phylogeny ==
=== Among species ===
To date, the genus Xenoturbella is composed of six species distributed into two clades by their environment's depth: three species which reside at depths up to 400–650 metres (1,310–2,130 ft) compose a shallow-water clade; and three species which reside deeper than 1,700 metres (5,600 ft) compose a deep-water clade.

The two smallest species, X. bocki and X. hollandorum, which are up to 4 centimetres (1.6 in) long, are found in shallower waters less than 650 metres (2,130 ft) deep. They form a clade together with a third species, X. japonica, which is slightly over 5 centimetres (2.0 in) long and was found in waters less than 560 metres (1,840 ft) deep. Three larger species, X. monstrosa, X. churro, and X. profunda, which were 10 centimetres (3.9 in) or more long and lived in deeper waters 1,700–3,700 metres (5,600–12,100 ft), form another clade.

Species-level cladogram of the genus Xenoturbella.

- Xenacoelomorpha
  - Acoelomorpha
  - Xenoturbella
    - 'Shallow' clade
      - X. japonica
      - - X. bocki
        - X. hollandorum
    - 'Deep' clade
      - X. monstrosa
      - - X. churro
        - X. profunda

The cladogram has been reconstructed from mitochondrial DNA and protein sequences.

=== Among animals ===
The systematic and phylogenetic position of Xenoturbella among animals has been considered enigmatic since its discovery. An early DNA analysis suggested a close relationship to molluscs, but it was probably a result of contamination with DNA of molluscs that Xenoturbella consumes.

A subsequent study suggested a placement of the genus in its own phylum, Xenoturbellida, as a deuterostome clade and sister group to the Ambulacraria. The deuterostome affiliations were then recovered by studies that indicate a basal position of this phylum within the deuterostomes or in a sister group relationship with the Ambulacraria.

However, morphological characters, such as the structure of epidermal cilia, suggested a close relationship with Acoelomorpha, another problematic group. The study of the embryonic stages of Xenoturbella also showed that it is a direct developer without a feeding larval stage, and this developmental mode is similar to that of acoelomorphs. Molecular studies based on the concatenation of hundreds of proteins revealed indeed a monophyletic group composed of Xenoturbella and Acoelomorpha. This clade was named Xenacoelomorpha.

The monophyly of Xenacoelomorpha soon became established, but its position as either a basal bilaterian clade or a deuterostome remained unresolved until 2016, when two new studies, with increased gene and taxon sampling, again placed Xenoturbella as the sister group of Acoelomorpha within Xenacoelomorpha, and placed Xenacoelomorpha as sister to Nephrozoa (Protostomia plus Deuterostomia), and therefore the basalmost bilaterian phylum.
