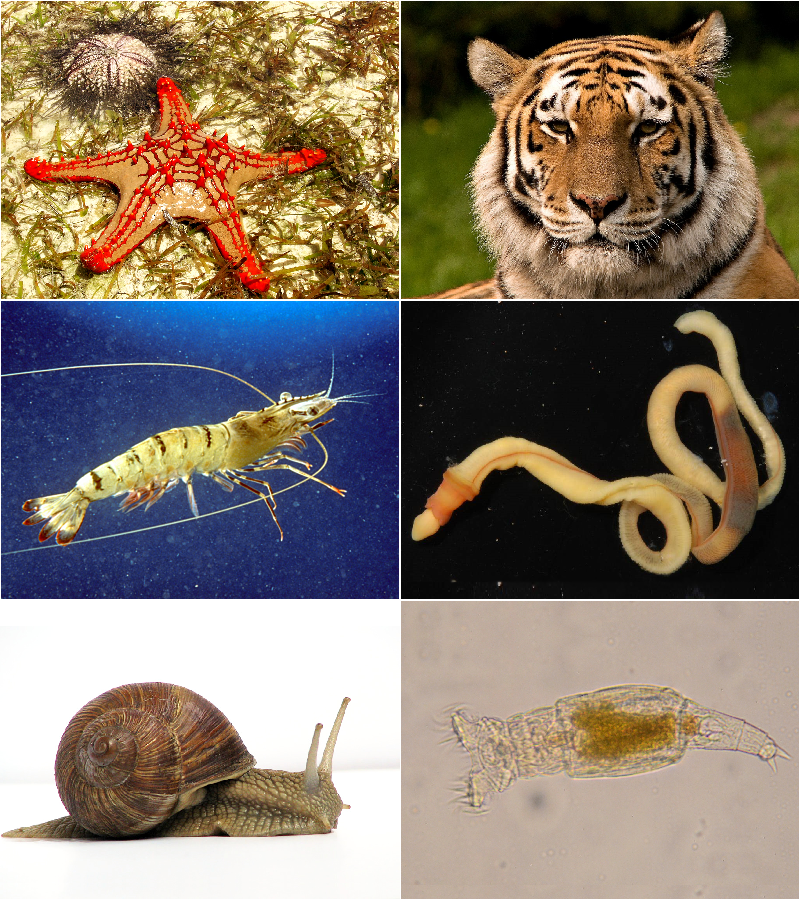

Scientific classification
- Kingdom: Animalia
- Subkingdom: Eumetazoa
- Clade: ParaHoxozoa
- Clade: Bilateria
- Clade: Nephrozoa; Jondelius et al., 2002

Subdivisions
- Deuterostomia; Chordata; Ambulacraria; Protostomia; Ecdysozoa; Spiralia

Synonyms
- Eubilateria Ax, 1984

= Nephrozoa =

Nephrozoa Temporal range: Ediacaran - Present, 558–0 Ma

Proposed clade of animals

Nephrozoa is a proposed major clade that would contain nearly all living bilaterian animals. Under this hypothesis, Xenacoelomorpha forms the earliest diverging branch of Bilateria, with all other bilaterians placed in Nephrozoa. It contrasts with the Xenambulacraria hypothesis, which instead posits that Xenacoelomorpha is most closely related to Ambulacraria (usually placed as deuterostomes). Which hypothesis is correct has been debated, and as of 2024, the issue is unresolved. The clade is named after a key synapomorphy of the group: the presence of specialized excretory organs known as nephridia.

== Phylogenetic tree ==
Below is a proposed phylogenetic tree of Nephrozoa:

- Bilateria
  - Xenacoelomorpha
    - Xenoturbellida
    - Acoelomorpha
  - Nephrozoa
    - Deuterostomia
      - Ambulacraria
      - Chordata
    - Protostomia
      - Ecdysozoa
      - Spiralia
