= Embryo fossil =

Fossil of unhatched or unborn organisms

Embryo fossils are the preserved remains of unhatched or unborn organisms. Many fossils of the 580 million year old Doushantuo Formation have been interpreted as embryos; embryos are also common throughout the Cambrian fossil record.

== Preservation ==
Taphonomic studies indicate that embryos are preserved for longest in reducing, anoxic conditions. These conditions can keep the embryos intact for long enough for bacteria to mineralise the cells and permit their preservation. However, phosphatisation was very rapid in the Doushantuo, so it is possible that faster preservation allowed embryos in different regimes to be preserved.

Preservation is mediated by bacterial biofilms. The cells of the embryo break down within hours of their death, under the effect of its own enzymes. Bacteria invade the decaying embryo before its cells can collapse, and biofilms take on and preserve the three-dimensional structure of the cells. The activity of these bacteria promote mineralisation.

Currently, only fossils representing very early stages in embryonic development have been preserved—no embryos have been interpreted as having undergone a large number cleavage stages.

== Affinities ==
Some embryos have been interpreted as colonies of sulfur-reducing bacteria, a claim that cannot be upheld in all cases.

Embryo fossils found in Doushantuo Formation of southern China exhibit occasional asynchronous cell division, common in modern embryos, implying that sophisticated mechanisms for differential cell division timing and embryonic cell lineage differentiation evolved before 551 million years ago. However, embryos composed of hundreds to more than ~1000 cells still show no evidence of blastocoel formation or the organization of blastomeres into epithelia – epithelialization should be underway in modern embryos with >100 cells. Features preserved on Doushantuo embryos are compatible with metazoans (animals), but the absence of epithelialization is consistent only with a stem-metazoan affinity. It is not until the Cambrian that embryos with demonstrable eumetazoan features occur; gastrulation and a pentaradial symmetry are expressed in some lower Cambrian fossils.

Some fossil embryos are considered to belong to cnidarians and ecdysozoans, if they even fall into the metazoan crown group. No deuterostome or lophotrochozoan embryos have yet been reported, despite their similar preservation potential; this may be a result of different egg laying behaviour, as ecdysozoans lay eggs in the sediment rather than releasing them into the open – enhancing the chance of them becoming mineralised.

An alternative interpretation of the embryos appears to discount an animal – or indeed embryonic – interpretation altogether. Cell division without enlargement appears to continue beyond what it would in embryos, and without other embryonic traits becoming apparent. Such division is found in a wide range of eukaryotes, including some that are not truly multicellular, and this more conservative interpretation looks to be more parsimonious than embryonic claims.

Some have also been interpreted as algal.

== Dinosaurs ==
Some hadrosaur fossils recovered from the Dinosaur Park Formation may represent embryos. Titanosaurian and tyrannosaurid embryos are also known.
