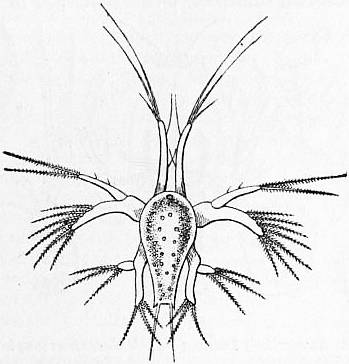
- Many animals have bilateral symmetry, at least at the embryo stage, providing the name for the clade. Nauplius larva of a prawn (crustacean) illustrated.

Scientific classification
- Kingdom: Animalia
- Subkingdom: Eumetazoa
- Clade: ParaHoxozoa
- Clade: Bilateria; Hatschek, 1888

Subdivisions
- Xenacoelomorpha; Nephrozoa; †Ikaria; Deuterostomia; Chordata; Ambulacraria; Protostomia; Ecdysozoa; Spiralia; See text for alternative relationships.

Synonyms
- Triploblasta Lankester, 1873

= Bilateria =

Bilateria Temporal range: Ediacaran–Present, 567–0 Ma

Animals with embryonic bilateral symmetry

Bilateria (/ˌbaɪləˈtɪəriə/) is a large clade of animals characterised by bilateral symmetry during embryonic development. This means their body plans are laid around a longitudinal axis with a front (or "head") and a rear (or "tail") end, as well as a left–right–symmetrical belly (ventral) and back (dorsal) surface. Nearly all bilaterians maintain a bilaterally symmetrical body as adults; the most notable exception is the echinoderms, which have pentaradial symmetry as adults, but bilateral symmetry as embryos. With few exceptions, bilaterian embryos are triploblastic, having three germ layers: endoderm, mesoderm and ectoderm, and have complete digestive tracts with a separate mouth and anus. Some bilaterians lack body cavities, while others have a primary body cavity derived from the blastocoel, or a secondary cavity, the coelom. Cephalization is a characteristic feature among most bilaterians, where the sense organs and central nerve ganglia become concentrated at the front end of the animal.

Bilaterians constitute one of the five main lineages of animals, the other four being Porifera (sponges), Cnidaria (jellyfish, hydrozoans, sea anemones and corals), Ctenophora (comb jellies) and Placozoa. They rapidly diversified in the late Ediacaran and the Cambrian, and are now by far the most successful animal lineage, with over 98% of known animal species. Bilaterians are traditionally classified as either deuterostomes or protostomes, on the basis of whether the blastopore becomes the anus or mouth. The phylum Xenacoelomorpha, once thought to be flatworms, was erected in 2011, and has provided an extra challenge to bilaterian taxonomy, as they likely do not belong to either group.

== Body plan ==
Animals with a bilaterally symmetric body plan that mainly move in one direction have a head end (anterior) and a tail (posterior) end as well as a back (dorsal) and a belly (ventral); therefore they also have a left side and a right side. Having a front end means that this part of the body encounters stimuli, such as food, favouring cephalisation, the development of a head with sense organs and a mouth. Most bilaterians (nephrozoans) have a gut that extends through the body from mouth to anus (sometimes called a "through gut"), and sometimes a wormlike body plan with a hydrostatic skeleton. Xenacoelomorphs, on the other hand, have a bag gut with one opening. Many bilaterian phyla have primary larvae which swim with cilia and have an apical organ containing sensory cells.

Some bilaterians have only weakly condensed nerve nets (similar to those in cnidarians), while others have either a ventral nerve cord, a dorsal nerve cord, both (e.g. in Hemichordate), or a different number of either.

== Evolution ==
=== Common ancestor ===
The hypothetical most recent common ancestor of all Bilateria is termed the 'urbilaterian'. The nature of this first bilaterian is a matter of debate. One side suggests that acoelomates gave rise to the other groups (planuloid–aceloid hypothesis by Ludwig von Graff, Elie Metchnikoff, Libbie Hyman, or Luitfried von Salvini-Plawen). This means that the urbilaterian had a solid body, and all body cavities therefore secondarily arose later in different groups. The other side poses that the urbilaterian had a coelom, meaning that the main acoelomate phyla (flatworms and gastrotrichs) have secondarily lost their body cavities. This is the Archicoelomata hypothesis first proposed by A. T. Masterman in 1899. Variations of the Archicoelomata hypothesis are the Gastraea by Ernst Haeckel in 1872 or Adam Sedgwick, and more recently the Bilaterogastrea by Gösta Jägersten, and the Trochaea by Claus Nielsen.

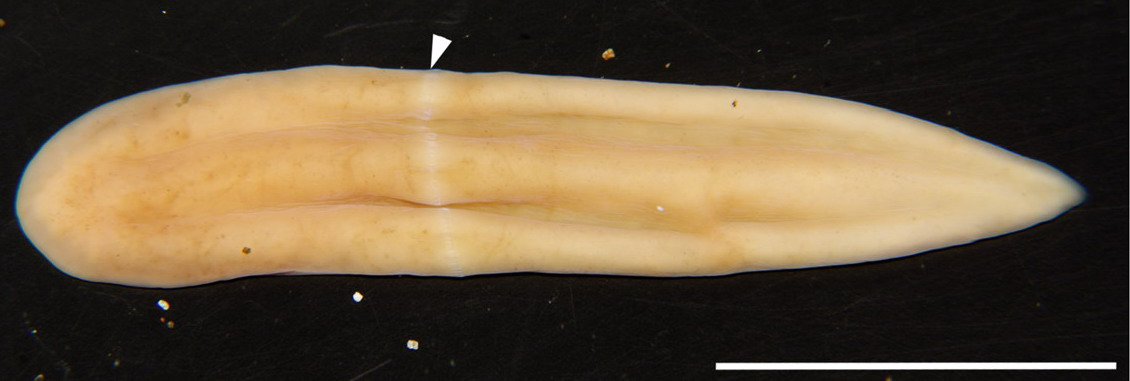
One view is that the original bilaterian was a marine worm somewhat like Xenoturbella.

One proposal, by Johanna Taylor Cannon and colleagues, is that the original bilaterian was a bottom dwelling worm with a single body opening, similar to Xenoturbella. An alternative proposal, by Jaume Baguñà and colleagues, is that it may have resembled the planula larvae of some cnidarians, which unlike the radially-symmetric adults have some bilateral symmetry. However, Lewis I. Held presents evidence that it was segmented, as the mechanism for creating segments is shared between vertebrates (deuterostomes) and arthropods (protostomes).

Bilaterians, presumably including the urbilaterian, share many more Hox genes controlling the development of their more complex bodies, including of their heads, than do the Cnidaria and the Acoelomorpha.

=== Fossil record ===
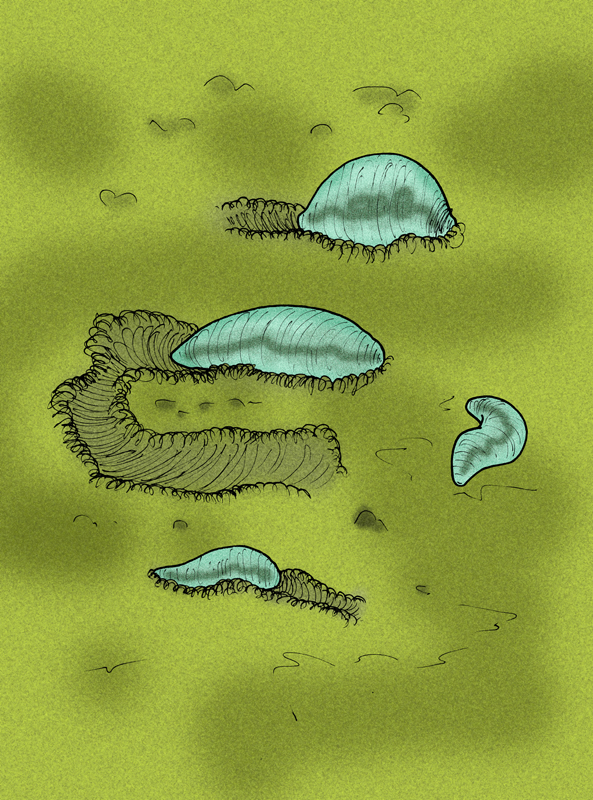
Ikaria wariootia, living 571–539 million years ago, is one of the oldest bilaterians identified.

The first evidence of Bilateria in the fossil record comes from trace fossils in Ediacaran sediments, and the first bona fide bilaterian fossil is Kimberella, dating to 555 million years ago. Earlier fossils are controversial; the fossil Vernanimalcula may be the earliest known bilaterian, but may also represent an infilled bubble. Fossil embryos are known from around the time of Vernanimalcula (580 million years ago), but none of these have bilaterian affinities. Burrows believed to have been created by bilaterian life forms have been found in the Tacuarí Formation of Uruguay, and were believed to be at least 585 million years old. However, more recent evidence shows these fossils are actually late Paleozoic, not Ediacaran.

=== Phylogeny ===
The Bilateria are now by far the most successful animal lineage, with over 98% of known animal species. The group has traditionally been divided into two main lineages or superphyla. The deuterostomes traditionally include the echinoderms, hemichordates, chordates, and the extinct Vetulicolia. The protostomes include most of the rest, such as arthropods, annelids, molluscs, and flatworms. There are several differences, most notably in how the embryo develops. In particular, the first opening of the embryo becomes the mouth in protostomes, and the anus in deuterostomes. Many taxonomists now recognise at least two more superphyla among the protostomes, Ecdysozoa and Spiralia. The arrow worms (Chaetognatha) have proven difficult to classify. Studies published in 2004 and 2017 place them in the Gnathifera.

The traditional division of Bilateria into Deuterostomia and Protostomia was challenged when new morphological and molecular evidence supported a sister relationship between the acoelomate taxa, Acoela and Nemertodermatida (together called Acoelomorpha), and the remaining bilaterians. The latter clade was called Nephrozoa by Jondelius et al. (2002) and Eubilateria by Baguña and Riutort (2004). The acoelomorph taxa had previously been considered flatworms with secondarily lost characteristics, but the new relationship suggested that the simple acoelomate worm form was the original bilaterian body plan and that the coelom, the digestive tract, excretory organs, and nerve cords developed in the Nephrozoa. Subsequently, the acoelomorphs were placed in phylum Xenacoelomorpha, together with the xenoturbellids, and the sister relationship between Xenacoelomorpha and Nephrozoa supported in phylogenomic analyses.>

A cladogram for Bilateria under the Nephrozoa hypothesis from a 2014 review by Casey Dunn and colleagues, is shown below.

- Bilateria
  - Xenacoelomorpha
    - Xenoturbellida
    - Acoelomorpha
  - Nephrozoa
    - Deuterostomia anus before mouth
      - Ambulacraria
      - Chordata
    - Protostomia
      - Ecdysozoa
      - Spiralia

A different hypothesis is that Ambulacraria is sister to Xenacoelomorpha, together forming Xenambulacraria. Xenambulacraria may be sister to Chordata or to Centroneuralia (corresponding to Nephrozoa without Ambulacraria, or, as shown here, to Chordata + Protostomia). A 2019 study by Hervé Philippe and colleagues presents the tree, cautioning that "the support values are very low, meaning there is no solid evidence to refute the traditional protostome and deuterostome dichotomy". As of 2024, the issue of which hypothesis is correct remains unresolved.

Cladogram showing Xenambulacraria hypothesis with a paraphyletic Deuterostomia:

- Bilateria
  - Xenambulacraria
    - Xenacoelomorpha
    - Ambulacraria
  - Centroneuralia
    - Chordata
    - Protostomia
      - Ecdysozoa
      - Spiralia

Cladogram showing hypothesis of Xenambulacraria within a monophyletic Deuterostomia:

- Bilateria
  - Deuterostomia
    - Xenambulacraria
      - Xenacoelomorpha
      - Ambulacraria
    - Chordata
  - Protostomia
    - Ecdysozoa
    - Spiralia

== Taxonomic history ==
The Bilateria were named by the Austrian embryologist Berthold Hatschek in 1888. In his classification, the group included the Zygoneura, Ambulacraria, and Chordonii (the Chordata). In 1910, the Austrian zoologist Karl Grobben renamed the Zygoneura to Protostomia, and created the Deuterostomia to encompass the Ambulacraria and Chordonii.

== See also ==
- Embryological origins of the mouth and anus
