= Exogenous DNA =

DNA originating from outside an organism

Exogenous DNA strands (Red and Green) shown inside a cell's nucleus.

Exogenous DNA is DNA originating outside the organism of concern or study. Exogenous DNA can be found naturally in the form of partially degraded fragments left over from dead cells. These DNA fragments may then become integrated into the chromosomes of nearby bacterial cells to undergo mutagenesis. This process of altering bacteria is known as transformation. Bacteria may also undergo artificial transformation through chemical and biological processes. The introduction of exogenous DNA into eukaryotic cells is known as transfection. Exogenous DNA can also be artificially inserted into the genome, which revolutionized the process of genetic modification in animals. By microinjecting an artificial transgene into the nucleus of an animal embryo, the exogenous DNA is allowed to merge the cell's existing DNA to create a genetically modified, transgenic animal. The creation of transgenic animals also leads into the study of altering sperm cells with exogenous DNA.

== History ==
In 1928, bacteriologist Fredrick Griffith observed exogenous DNA alongside bacterial transformation in the species Streptococcus pneumoniae. In further tests, physician Oswald Avery was able to isolate and confirm that the DNA used in the experiment originated from outside the cell and integrated itself into the cell's genome. Repeated experiments proved exogenous DNA integration was possible in other species of bacteria, prompting studies to extend to mammal cells. The technology for the injection of exogenous DNA into organisms was discovered by Lin in 1966. He was able to use a fine glass needle to insert laboratory-produced DNA into mouse zygotes without breaking their nuclei. In 1976, the first successful delivery of exogenous DNA into mice was performed by Jaenisch using the Moloney leukemia virus.

== Applications ==
=== Transformation ===
The integration of exogenous DNA with the genome of a cell is called transformation (transfection in animal cells). Transformation is a naturally occurring process in bacteria. To successfully take up exogenous DNA, bacteria need to be in a state of competence. Some bacteria are naturally competent, but usually only for a brief time at a certain stage of their growth cycle. Bacteria can also be made competent through a variety of chemical treatments. These treatments typically involve making the targeted cell membrane more permeable towards accepting exogenous DNA, one such example being exposing the bacteria to a calcium ion solution, or a mixture of polyethylene glycol and dimethylsulfoxide. Another treatment method is the utilization of electricity (electroporation or electro transformation) to create holes in the cell membrane for the DNA to enter. Finally, liposome-mediated transformation can be used. The cell surface and the incoming DNA are both negatively charged, so the DNA is coated with lipids. By shielding the DNA and possibly merging with the membrane lipids, these liposomes can facilitate the entry of DNA.

Transformation of bacteria, plant cells and animal cells has important research and commercial functions. Targeted introduction of exogenous DNA is used to identify genes because the introduced DNA can cause a mutation or alter the expression of the targeted gene, providing a unique identifying signal. This technology, known as insertion mutagenesis, often employs retroviruses as the vectors of DNA delivery. Such insertion mutagenesis has been often used to identify many oncogenes in specific locations in tumor cells.

=== Transfection ===
Transfection is the process of introducing exogenous DNA into eukaryotic cells. It is a more specific term for animal cells, as the process of carcinogenesis in these cells is also included in the definition of transformation. Typically, transfection describes the changes in a cell's genome due to the introduction of foreign DNA. There are several ways of conducting artificial transfection. Chemical methods involve using chemicals as carriers to introduce DNA, such as calcium phosphate precipitation, DEAE-dextran complexation and lipid-mediated DNA transfer. Physical methods use techniques such as electroporation, microinjection, and cell squeezing to increase the permeability of the cell membrane for accepting DNA. Viral methods (or transduction) use recombinant, lab manipulated viruses as vectors to alter embryos and sperm cells.

=== Transgenesis ===
The use of exogenous DNA to transform cells has spawned the discipline of transgenesis: the use of recombinant DNA techniques to introduce new characters into organisms, mainly through transgenes. A transgene is an introduced DNA segment that be used to encode a gene in its host animal. Biologists uses transgenesis as a tool to breed genetically modified, or transgenic animals that provide a wide range of uses. These include the study of developmental genetics, disease processes and gene regulation. For example, transgenic farm animals can produce human pharmaceuticals alongside increased milk or meat production. Tissues and organs from transgenic animals can also be used in transfusions and transplants with a lesser chance of immune rejection.

=== Sperm cells ===
Using transgenesis to genetically modify animals has spawned a new division of using exogenous DNA to modify sperm cells. Epididymal sperm cells were shown to react to exogenous nucleic acids, allowing for DNA to reversibly bind to the spermatozoa through ionic interactions. The ability of sperm cells to locate and internalize exogenous DNA was then used to transfer foreign genes into an oocyte during fertilization to create transgenic animals. However, a low efficiency rate hinders this technique due to the low uptake of exogenous DNA by sperm cells compounded with the low fertilization rate of the oocyte.

== See also ==
- Mutagenesis
- Transfection
- Transduction
- Gene Transfer
- Sperm-mediated gene transfer (SMGT)
- Horizontal gene transfer
