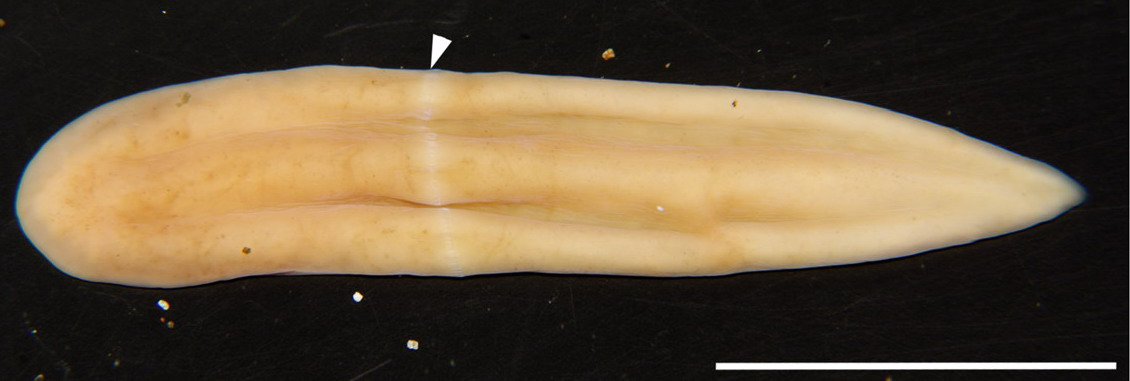
- Xenoturbella japonica, a xenoturbellid
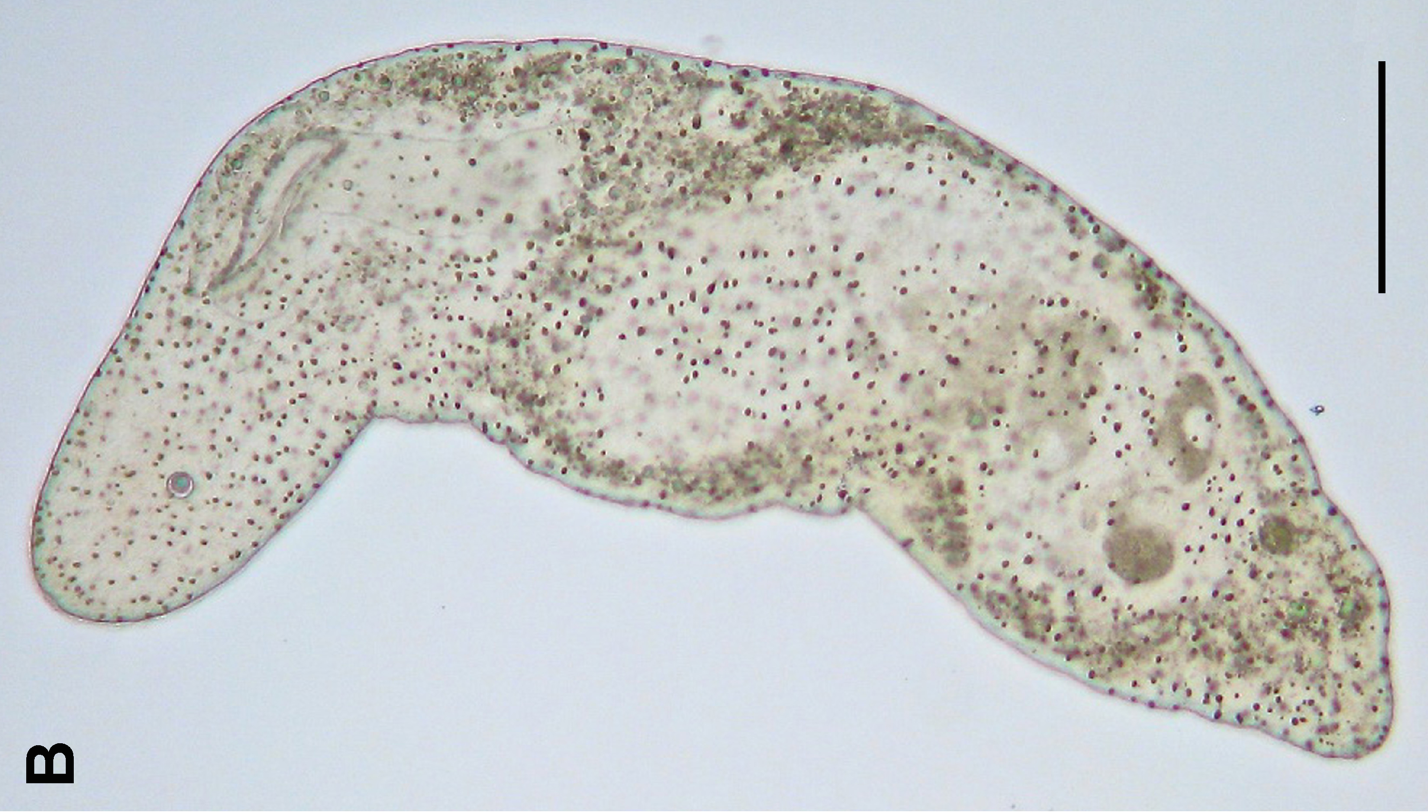
- Proporus sp., an acoelomorph

Scientific classification
- Kingdom: Animalia
- Subkingdom: Eumetazoa
- Clade: ParaHoxozoa
- Clade: Bilateria
- Phylum: Xenacoelomorpha; Philippe et al. 2011

Subdivisions
- Xenoturbellida; Acoelomorpha

= Xenacoelomorpha =

Phylum of animals

Xenacoelomorpha (/ˌzɛnəˌsɛloʊˈmɔːrfə/) is a small phylum of bilaterian invertebrate animals, consisting of two sister groups: acoelomorphs and xenoturbellids. This new phylum was named in February 2011 and suggested based on morphological synapomorphies (physical appearances shared by the animals in the clade), which was then confirmed by phylogenomic analyses of molecular data (similarities in the DNA of the animals within the clade).

== Phylogenetics ==
Prior to molecular studies, xenacoelomorphs were considered to be flatworms based on their superficial similarities. Like flatworms, they do not have a coelom and are dorsoventrally flattened. With the advent of phylogenetics, Xenoturbella and Acoelomorpha were found to be sister groups and only distantly related to flatworms. Initially, this phylum was considered to be a member of the deuterostomes, but later transcriptome analyses have suggested that the phylum Xenacoelomorpha is a sister group to all the other bilateria. In this model, Xenacoelomorpha are neither protostomes nor deuterostomes, and the protostomes and deuterostomes together make up a new clade that has been named Nephrozoa. This makes Xenacoelomorpha the basalmost bilaterian clade.

- Bilateria
  - Xenacoelomorpha
  - Nephrozoa
    - Deuterostomia
      - Ambulacraria
      - Chordata
    - Protostomia
      - Ecdysozoa
      - Spiralia

Their larvae show similarities with cnidarian planula larvae and poriferan parenchyma larvae, but it is not clear if the similarities are ancestral or derived.

However, some studies point out that their basal placement may be caused by high mutation rates leading to long branch attraction (LBA). These analyses suggest that the xenacoelomorphs are instead the sister group of Ambulacraria, forming the clade Xenambulacraria, and that despite their simple body plans, they actually derive from a more complex ancestor. Having a larger number of species within this group would allow for better conclusions and analysis to be made within the phylum and in groups closely related to the phylum.

- Bilateria
  - Deuterostomia
    - Xenambulacraria
      - Ambulacraria
      - Xenacoelomorpha
    - Chordata
  - Protostomia
    - Ecdysozoa
    - Spiralia

=== Internal phylogeny ===
For multiple decades, the genus Xenoturbella contained only one species, X. bocki. In 2016, however, a team reported the discovery of four new species from the Gulf of California and sequenced each new species' mitogenome and, upon analysis, found that the two species that lived in shallow water (X. bocki and X. hollandorum) formed a "shallow" clade and that three deep water species formed a "deep" clade. The following year, another team discovered a sixth species, X. japonica, found off the coast of Japan. Their phylogenetic analysis confirmed the first team's hypothesis and placed X. japonica within the shallow clade.

The other two groups, Nemertodermatida and Acoela, have less clear relationships as species-level phylogenies have not been conducted. Nemertodermatida only has two families and six total genera. Ascopariidae contains two of these genera, while Nemertodermatidae has the other four. A 2016 study analyzed three of the four Nemertodermatid genera and found that Sterreria and Meara are closer to each other than to Nemertoderma, while Nemertinoides was left unplaced. Acoela phylogeny is even less certain, as it is by far the most diverse part of the phylum and is very understudied. A 2011 study attempted to solve this problem and recovered numerous traditional families as polyphyletic. They also recovered a tentative clade of various species from Actinoposthiidae and Isodiametridae, which is not shown in the cladogram below. Several small basal families were not included in their study, and their position is still uncertain.

- Xenacoelomorpha
  - Xenoturbella
    - Shallow clade
      - X. japonica
      - - X. bocki
        - X. hollandorum
    - Deep clade
      - X. monstrosa
      - - X. churro
        - X. profunda
  - Acoelomorpha
    - Acoela
      - Actinoposthiidae
      - Antigonariidae
      - Antroposthiidae
      - Diopisthoporidae
      - Nadinidae
      - Paratomellidae
      - Taurididae
      - - Paratomellidae
        - Bursalia
          - Prosopharyngida
            - Hallangiidae
            - - Hofsteniidae
              - Solenofilomorphidae
          - Crucimusculata
            - Proporidae
            - - Isodiametridae
              - - Dakuidae
                - Aberrantospermata
                  - Convolutidae
                  - Mecynostomidae
    - Nemertodermatida
      - Ascopariidae
        - Ascoparia
        - Flagellophora
      - Nemertodermatidae
        - Nemertoderma
        - Nemertinoides
        - - Meara
          - Sterreria

== Characteristics ==
The phylum consists of small, flat, and worm-like creatures found in marine and sometimes brackish water environments, on the sediments. There are species that are variously free-living, parasitic, and symbiotic. They can be found at depths of almost 4 km (2.5 mi) and near hydrothermal vents.

The phylum is hermaphroditic (all individuals have both male and female sex organs) and reproduces sexually with direct development, meaning they skip a potentially vulnerable larval stage. Xenoturbella has external fertilization, and Acoelomorpha has internal fertilization. All xenacoelomorphs are bilateral, meaning they have a central front-to-back body axis with mirror-image right and left sides. They are triploblasts (meaning they have the three germ layers: ectoderm, endoderm, and mesoderm). Their body plan is acoelomate – they lack a coelom – do not have a true body cavity. Also, an excretory system is absent, yet all genes related to the excretory system are present except for Osr, which is essential for the development of such a system. In acoelomorphs, which have gone through rapid evolutionary rates and chromosomal rearrangements, about 60% of the genes shared between protostomes and deuterostomes are missing. How many of these genes, which are present or absent in Xenoturbella, will require whole-genome sequencing.

While other animals that are diploblastic (only have two germ layers: ectoderm and endoderm) also lack a coelom, those technically do not have an acoelomate body plan because they lack the mesoderm germ layer. In acoels, the mouth opens directly into a large endodermal syncytium, while in nemertodermatids and xenoturbellids, there is a sack-like gut lined by unciliated cells.

A defining feature is a digestive system lacking nerve cells. Because an enteric nervous system, also called the stomatogastric nervous system, is also found in many cnidarians, its absence is most likely a derived trait.

Their nervous systems are basiepidermal – located right under the epidermis – and they have no brain. The xenoturbellids' nervous system consists of a simple nerve net, with no special concentration of neurons. In acoelomorphs, the nervous system is arranged in a series of longitudinal bundles, united in the anterior region by a ring comissure of variable complexity.

The sensory organs include a statocyst (for balance). Some groups have two unicellular ocelli (simple eyes).

The epidermis of all species within the phylum is ciliated. The cilia are composed of a set of nine pairs of peripheral microtubules and one or two central microtubules (patterns 9+1 and 9+2, respectively). The pairs 4–7 terminate before the tip, creating a structure called a "shelf".

== See also ==
- List of bilaterial animal orders
