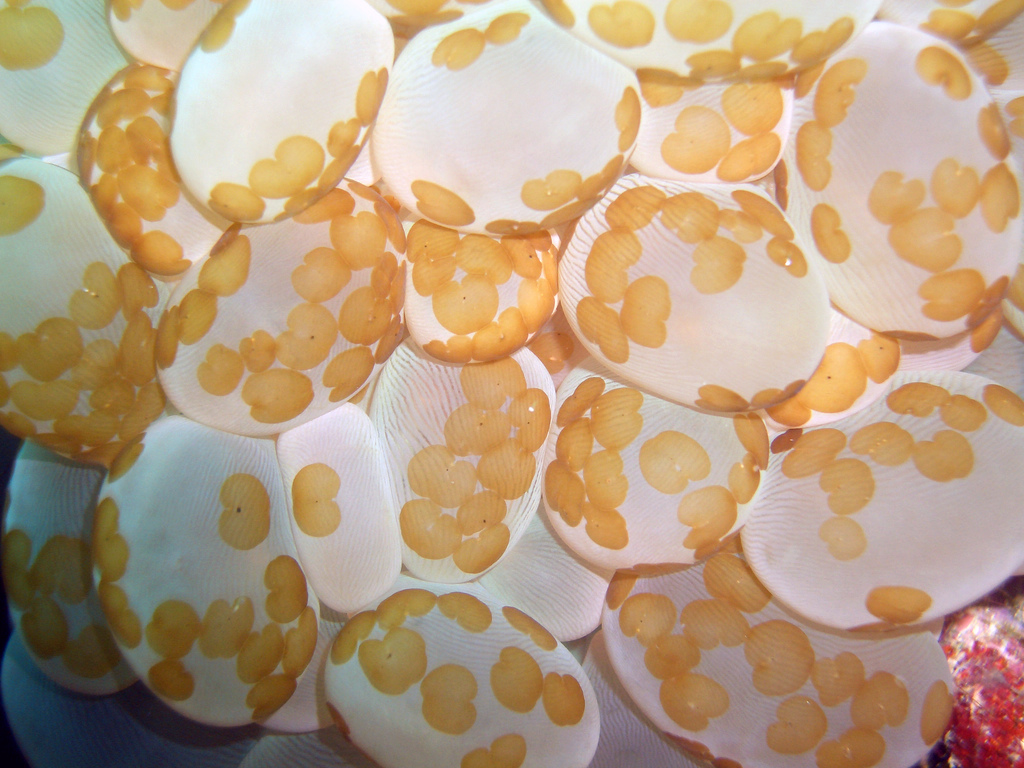
- The acoelomorph Waminoa sp. (orange structure) on the Plerogyra sp. coral (whitish bubbles).

Scientific classification
- Kingdom: Animalia
- Phylum: Xenacoelomorpha
- Subphylum: Acoelomorpha; Ehlers, 1985

Classes
- Acoela; Nemertodermatida

= Acoelomorpha =

Phylum of marine, flatworm-like animals

Acoelomorpha is a subphylum of very simple and small soft-bodied animals with planula-like features that live in marine or brackish waters. They usually live between grains of sediment, swimming as plankton, or crawling on other organisms, such as algae and corals. Except for two acoel freshwater species, all known acoelomorphs are marine.

== Systematics ==
=== Etymology ===
The term "acoelomorph" derives from the Ancient Greek words ἀ (a), the alpha privative, expressing negation or absence, κοιλία (koilía), meaning "cavity", and μορφή (morphḗ), meaning "form". This refers to the fact that acoelomorphs have a structure lacking a fluid-filled body cavity.

=== Classification ===
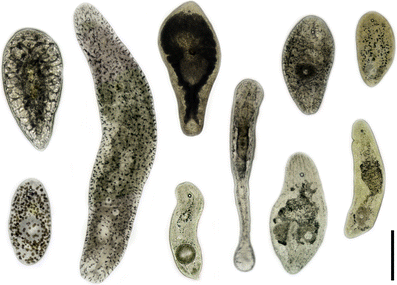
Various members of the Acoela class.

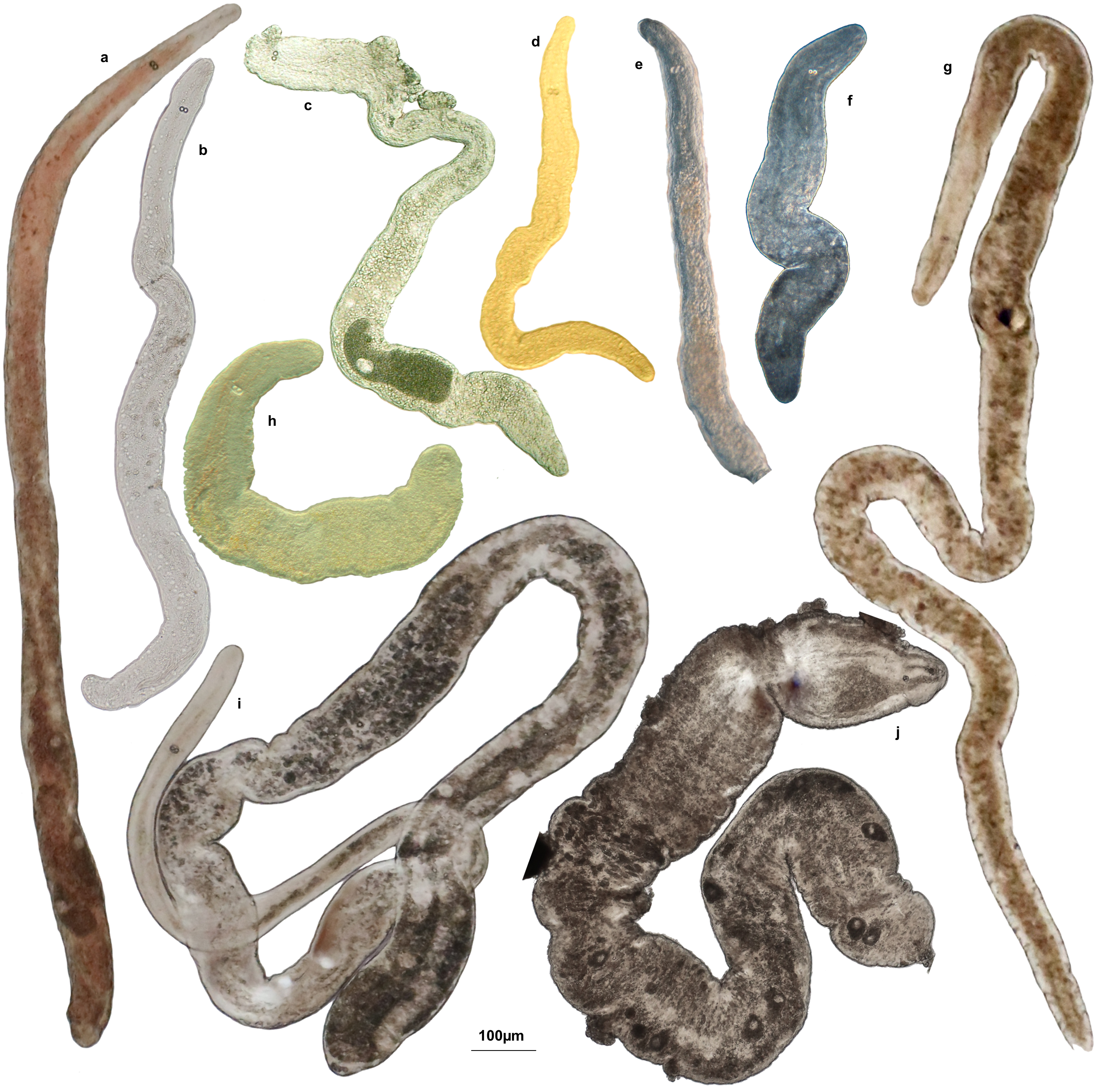
Various members of the Nemertodermatida class.

The subphylum Acoelomorpha is divided into two classes. There are at least 408 described species, with a majority of these falling within the Crucimusculata infraorder in Acoela.

- Acoela comprise small, flattened worms, classified into a dozen families.
- Nemertodermatida comprises millimetre-sized, mostly interstitial worms, distributed into two families.

=== Phylogeny ===
The soft bodies and the lack of some of the key bilaterian traits make acoelomorphs difficult to classify. Traditionally, based on phenotypic features, acoelomorphs were considered to belong to the phylum Platyhelminthes, which was long seen as the sister group to all other bilaterian phyla. However, a series of molecular phylogenetics studies at the hinge between the 20th and 21st centuries demonstrated that they are fast-evolving organisms not closely related to platyhelminthes, therefore involving the polyphyly of flatworms.

Acoelomorpha appeared to constitute a separate, deep-branching phylum, the kingpin of bilaterian evolution. Yet their evolutionary affinities remain enigmatic, as they might be the sister-group either to all other bilateral animals or to all deuterostomes. Resolving this debate would indicate whether acoelomorphs are simple or simplified. If they are the sister group to Bilateria, it would point to a simple body plan for the first bilaterian. Alternatively, if acoelomorphs are related to deuterostomes, this would imply that their organisation is the result of secondary simplification.

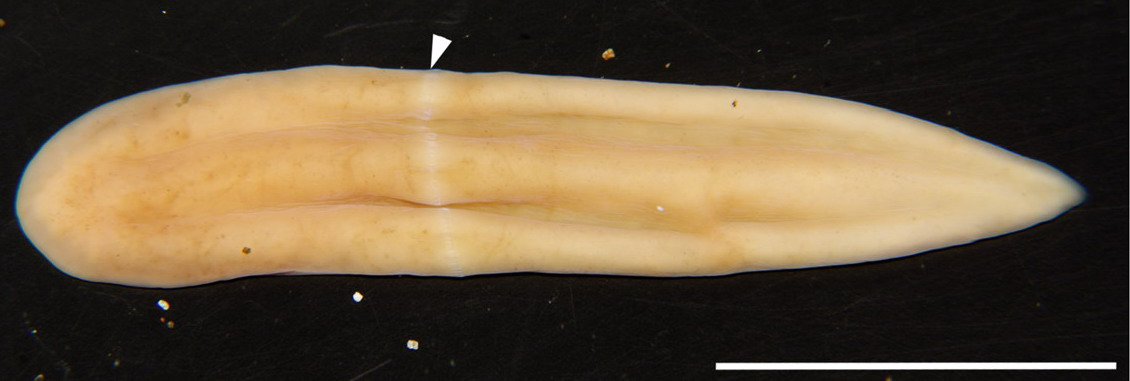
Xenoturbella, the sister group to acoelomorphs

In addition, comparative analyses of morphological, developmental, and molecular characters raised two points.

- Xenoturbellida is the sister group to acoelomorphs, constituting the so-called Xenacoelomorpha clade. The close evolutionary relationship between Acoelomorpha and Xenoturbella is supported by the morphology (structure of epidermal cilia), the embryology (direct development without a feeding larval stage), and the concatenation of hundreds of proteins.
- The phylogenetic placement of Xenacoelomorpha among bilaterian animals is not yet well defined, despite increased taxon and gene sampling, (re)-analyses of published data sets, and use of more sophisticated models of sequence evolution in phylogenomic studies. There is a conflict between two evolutionary hypotheses, with Xenacoelomorpha being the sister group to Ambulacraria within deuterostomes (i.e., the Xenambulacraria hypothesis) on the one hand, and Xenacoelomorpha as sister group to all other bilaterians (i.e., the Nephrozoa hypothesis) on the other. However, the Nephrozoa hypothesis might reflect methodological errors resulting from model violations in the phylogenomic inference.

== Anatomy ==
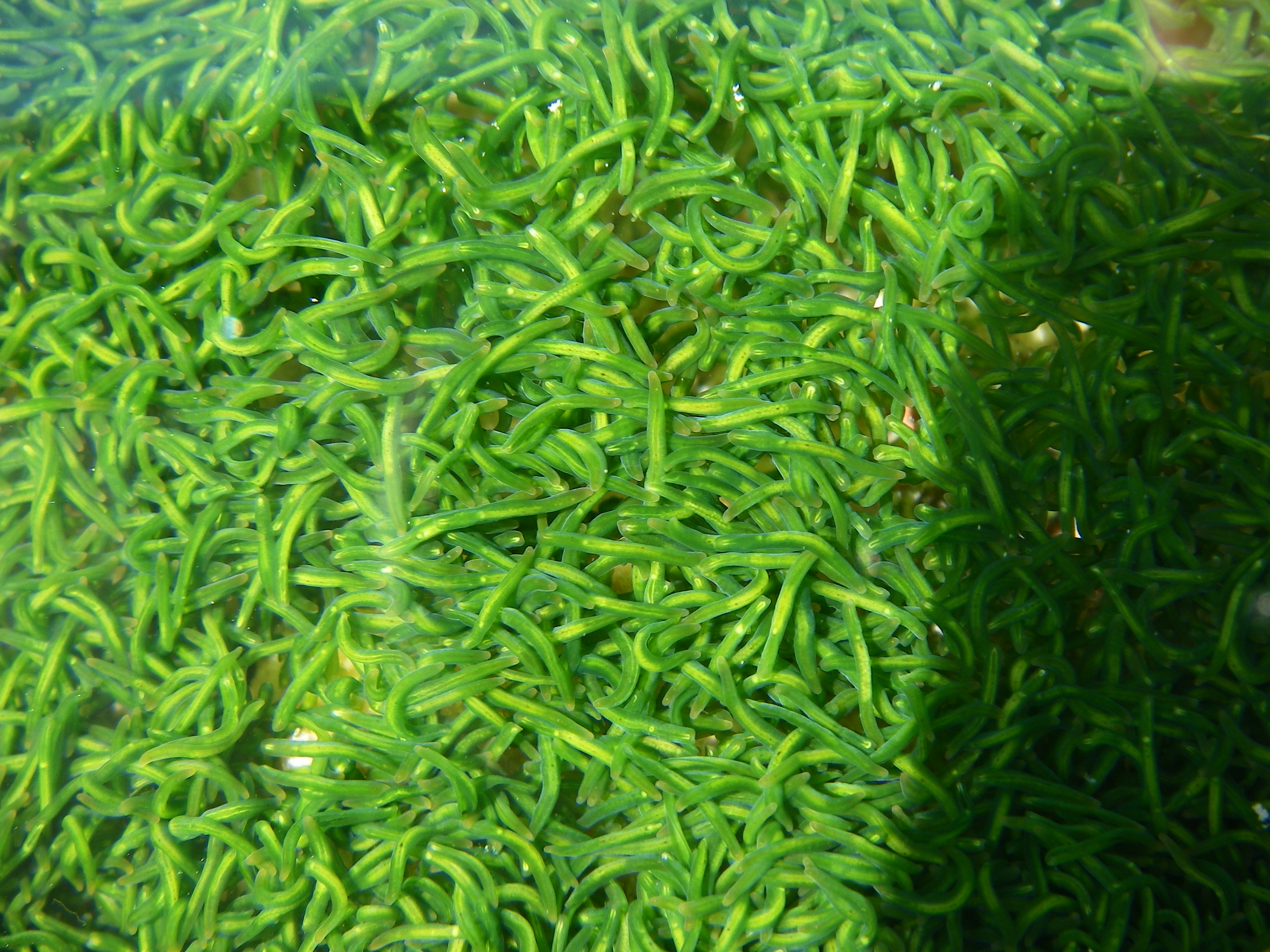
Symsagittifera roscoffensis

Acoelomorphs resemble flatworms in many respects, but have a simpler anatomy, not even having a gut. Like flatworms, they have no circulatory or respiratory systems, but they also lack an excretory system. They lack body cavities (acoelomate structure), a hindgut, or an anus.

The epidermal cells of acoelomorphs are unable to proliferate, a feature that is only shared with rhabditophoran flatworms and was, for some time, considered strong evidence for the position of Acoelomorpha within Platyhelminthes. In both groups, the epidermis is renewed from mesodermal stem cells.

The nervous system of acoelomorphs is formed by a set of longitudinal nerve bundles beneath the ciliated epidermis. Close to the anterior end, these bundles are united by a ring commissure, but do not form a true brain, although it is hypothesized that such organization was the precursor of the cephalization of the nerve system in more derived bilaterians. After decapitation, such a "brain" (rather, a cerebroid ganglion) regenerates in a few weeks.

The sensory organs include a statocyst, which presumably helps them orient to gravity, and, in some cases, ancestral pigment-spot ocelli capable of detecting light.

Acoelomorphs are simultaneous hermaphrodites but have no gonads and no ducts associated with the female reproductive system. Instead, gametes are produced from the mesenchymal cells that fill the body between the epidermis and the digestive vacuole.
