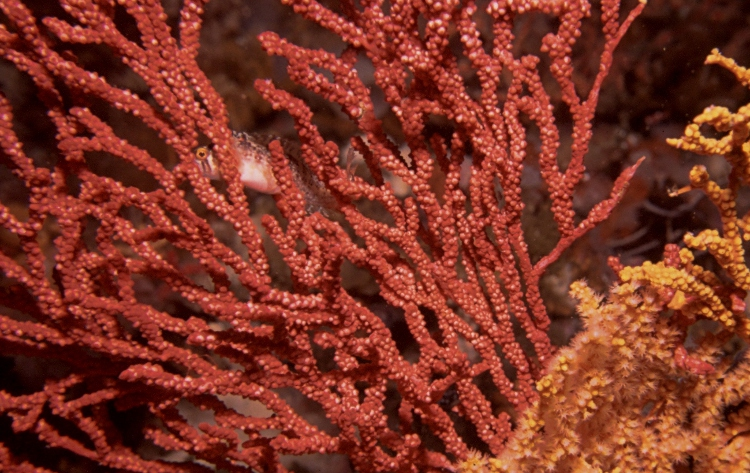

Scientific classification
- Kingdom: Animalia
- Phylum: Cnidaria
- Subphylum: Anthozoa
- Class: Octocorallia
- Order: Malacalcyonacea
- Family: Melithaeidae
- Genus: Melithaea
- Species: M. rubra

Binomial name
- Melithaea rubra (Esper, 1789)

Synonyms
- Acabaria rubra Esper, 1789

= Multicoloured sea fan =

Species of coral

The multicoloured sea fan (Melithaea rubra) is a species of gorgonian sea fan in the family Melithaeidae.

== Description ==
The sea fan colony grows up to about 30 cm high, with branches of between 2 and 4 mm. It is bushy with thin cylindrical branches which are often tangled or joined. The polyps emerge from knobs on the surface of the colony. It is variably coloured, with the colony being red, yellow, white or pink, and the individual polyps being white, yellow or red.

== Distribution ==
This sea fan is found only around the South African coast from Bloubergstrand to East London in 10–30 m of water. It is endemic to this region.

== Ecology ==
These sea fans are found on vertical surfaces on reefs and under overhangs, usually orientated perpendicularly to the water flow. It may grow in assemblages with sponges, bryozoans or tunicates. It is preyed upon by the coral nudibranch, Phyllodesmium horridum, as well as the walking anemone, Preactis millardae.
