= Melithaea philippinensis =

Scientific classification
- Kingdom: Animalia
- Phylum: Cnidaria
- Subphylum: Anthozoa
- Class: Octocorallia
- Order: Malacalcyonacea
- Family: Melithaeidae
- Genus: Melithaea
- Species: M. philippinensis

Binomial name
- Melithaea philippinensis (Wright & Studer, 1889)

Species of coral

Melithaea philippinensis is a coral, a member of octocorals in the family Melithaeidae. it is native the Philippine islands it was discovered by the H.M.S. Challenger during the years 1873–76 on a Zoology expedition.
