= Gastrovascular cavity =

Digestive organ in jellyfish and corals

The gastrovascular cavity or coelenteron of the flower hat jelly, Olindias formosa (arrow #2, colored gray)

Gastrovascular system of the flatworm Dugesia, colored yellow

The gastrovascular cavity is the primary organ of digestion and circulation in two major animal phyla: the Coelenterates or cnidarians (including jellyfish and corals) and Platyhelminthes (flatworms). The cavity may be extensively branched into a system of canals. In cnidarians, the gastrovascular system is also known as the coelenteron, and is commonly known as a "blind gut" or "blind sac", since food enters and waste exits through the same orifice.

The radially symmetrical cnidarians have a sac-like body in two distinct layers, the epidermis and gastrodermis, with a jellylike layer called the mesoglea between. Extracellular digestion takes place within the central cavity of the sac-like body. This cavity has only one opening to the outside which, in most cnidarians, is surrounded by tentacles for capturing prey.
