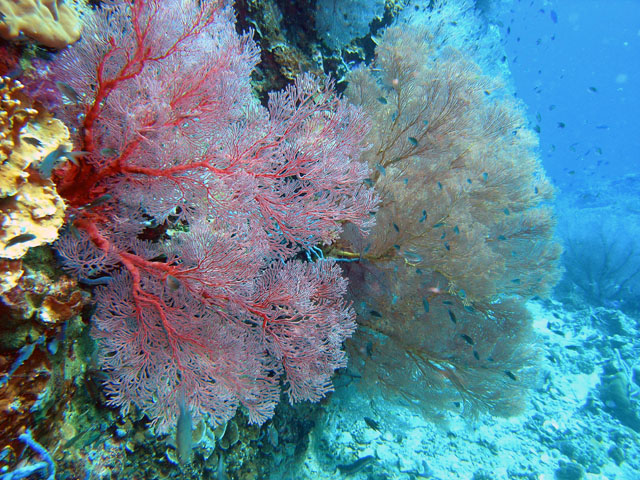
- Knotted fan coral at Pulau Tioman, West Malaysia

Scientific classification
- Kingdom: Animalia
- Phylum: Cnidaria
- Subphylum: Anthozoa
- Class: Octocorallia
- Order: Malacalcyonacea
- Family: Melithaeidae
- Genus: Melithaea
- Species: M. ochracea

Binomial name
- Melithaea ochracea (Linnaeus, 1758)

= Melithaea ochracea =

Species of coral

Melithaea ochracea is a species of colonial soft coral in the family Melithaeidae, commonly known as knotted fan coral. It grows in tree-like fans on coral reefs in the South China Sea. It grows in tree-like fans on coral reefs in the South China Sea and is used in the jewelry industry under the name red spongy coral.

== Description ==
Colonies of Melithaea ochracea are arborescent and usually grow to about 20 cm (8 in) long although much larger specimens can be found. They grow in one plane and have a branching, fan-shaped structure. The main skeletal stalk and branches are jointed, with swellings at the larger joints. The internodes are composed of hard, calcareous material while the joints are flexible and made of a horny material. The skeleton is covered by a flexible membrane, the mesoglea, which contains minute calcareous spicules or sclerites. The identity of these is important for distinguishing between different closely related species. In Melithaea ochracea, they include capstans, double discs, disc-spindles and unilaterally spinose spindles, plain spindles, clubs and anthocodial sclerites. Three sides of the branches are densely covered in calyces, dome shaped perforated structures from which the polyps protrude. Colonies vary in colour but tend to be shades of yellow, orange, red and white, sometimes with contrasting colours for the calyces and polyps. It is an azooxanthellate coral and does not contain symbiotic unicellular algae in its tissues. In Singapore, it sometimes grows close to the low tide mark at depths of under 3 metres (9.8 ft) where colonies grow larger than deeper water specimens and mostly have yellow branches and red calyces. At greater depths, down to 15 metres (49 ft), the colonies are smaller and have different colour combinations.

== Distribution and habitat ==
Melithaea ochracea grows on shallow reefs in the South China Sea between Taiwan and Indonesia. Its range also includes Singapore and Malaysia. In Taiwan, it is the most widespread gorgonian coral and is found on the higher parts of reef fronts where its numerous small polyps can feed at water flow rates varying from 4 to 40 centimetres (1.6 to 15.7 in) per second.

== Uses ==
Melithaea ochracea can be used in reef aquaria to add interest to fish tanks and requires a moderate flow of water to allow the polyps to feed on non-evasive zooplankton and probably also phytoplankton.

Melithaea ochracea is used in the jewellery industry where it is known as sponge coral because of the porous nature of the structure. Bright orange-red specimens are considered most desirable but variegated specimens, with yellow or orange streaks, are also sought after. Most of the sponge coral on the market has been stabilised by being filled with resin or polymer and polished. It is also sometimes dyed or crushed, mixed with epoxy resin and formed into the desired shape. It can be carved and is popular because it is relatively cheap. Natural, unenhanced coral is more expensive than its treated counterpart but it is difficult to find sufficient attractive rough material on the market. The coral measures 3.5 on the Mohs scale of mineral hardness so besides being easy to work, it is also easy to damage. It should not be worn next to the skin because it may become stained.

It is harvested in the South China Sea between Taiwan and Indonesia and is sometimes farmed. It grows much more quickly than the traditional hard corals (Crallium spp.) that are used in jewellery and its harvesting is believed to be sustainable.
