= Coral nudibranch =

Coral nudibranch may refer to:

- Phyllodesmium horridum
- Phyllodesmium serratum
