= Melithaea bicolor =

Scientific classification
- Kingdom: Animalia
- Phylum: Cnidaria
- Subphylum: Anthozoa
- Class: Octocorallia
- Order: Malacalcyonacea
- Family: Melithaeidae
- Genus: Melithaea
- Species: M. bicolor

Binomial name
- Melithaea bicolor (Nutting, 1908)

Synonyms
- Verrucella bicolor; Acabaria bicolor

Melithaea bicolor, also called bicolor gorgonian, is a coral in the family Melithaeidae endemic to Hawai'i.
