= Dactylanthus =

Dactylanthus may refer to:

- Dactylanthus (plant), genus with just one species: Dactylanthus taylorii, a parasitic plant from New Zealand
- Dactylanthus (cnidarian), genus with just one species: Dactylanthus antarcticus, a sea anemone from Antarctica and southern South America
