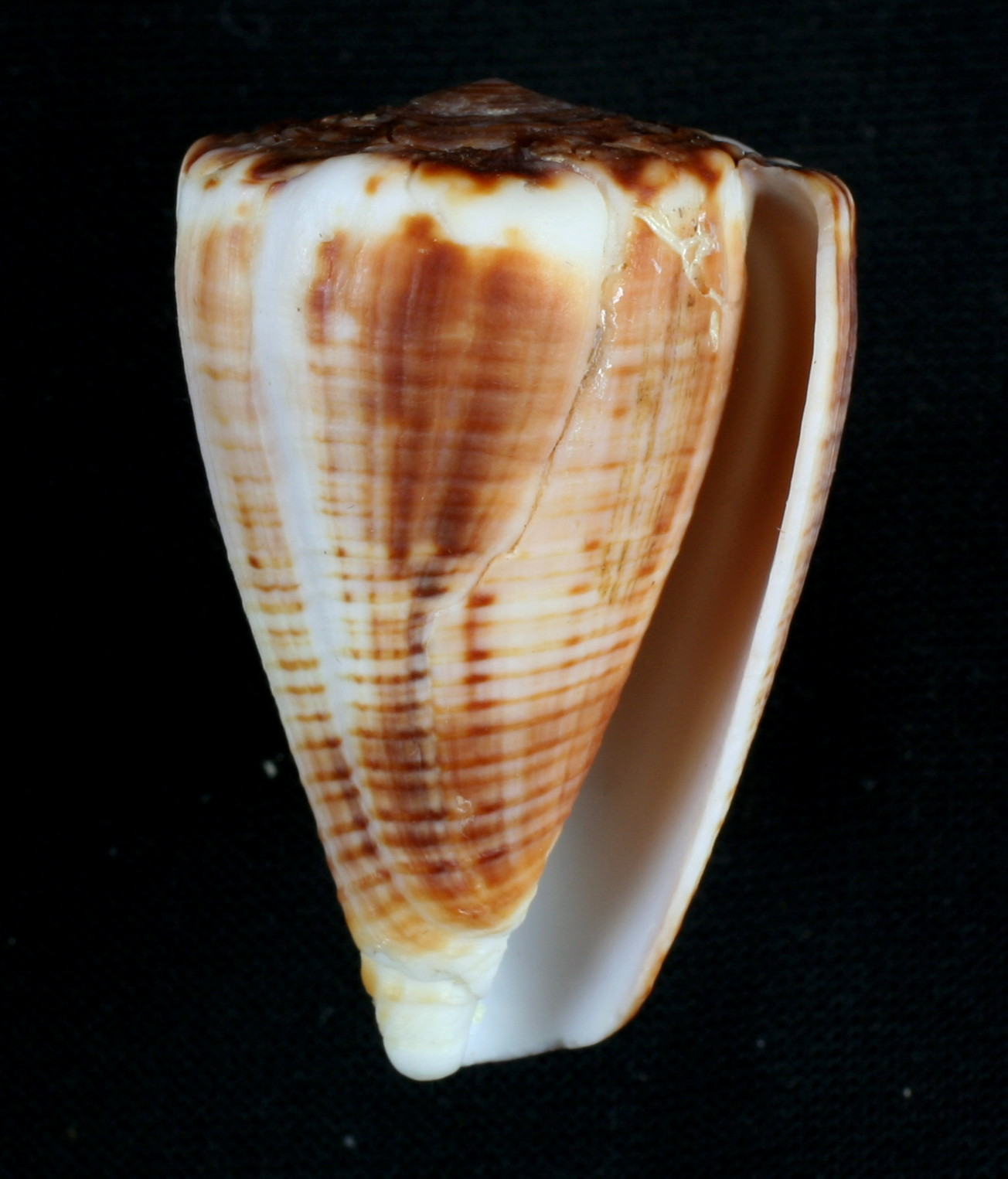
- Apertural view of shell of Conus gladiator Broderip, 1833

Conservation status
- Least Concern (IUCN 3.1)

Scientific classification
- Kingdom: Animalia
- Phylum: Mollusca
- Class: Gastropoda
- Subclass: Caenogastropoda
- Order: Neogastropoda
- Superfamily: Conoidea
- Family: Conidae
- Genus: Conus
- Species: C. gladiator

Binomial name
- Conus gladiator Broderip & Sowerby, 1833

Synonyms
- Conus (Monteiroconus) gladiator Broderip, 1833 · accepted, alternate representation; Conus cibielii Kiener, 1849; Conus evelynae G. B. Sowerby III, 1882; Conus gloynei G. B. Sowerby III, 1881; Gladioconus gladiator (Broderip, 1833)

= Conus gladiator =

Species of sea snail

Conus gladiator, common name the gladiator cone, is a species of sea snail, a marine gastropod mollusk in the family Conidae, the cone snails and their allies.

Like all species within the genus Conus, these snails are predatory and venomous. They are capable of stinging humans, therefore live ones should be handled carefully or not at all.

== Description ==
The size of an adult shell varies between 26 mm and 48 mm. The spire is rather depressed, tuberculate and striate. The color of the shell is chocolate-brown, variegated with white, disposed in longitudinal streaks, with an irregular white band, and more or less distinct revolving lines of darker brown. The interior is white or tinged with chocolate. The epidermis is fibrous.

== Distribution ==
This species occurs in the Pacific Ocean off the Galapagos Islands and from the Gulf of California to Peru.

== Gallery ==
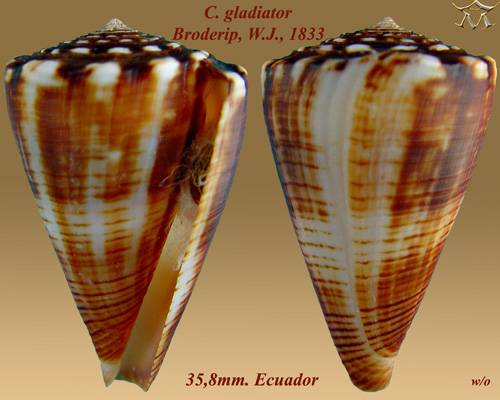
Conus gladiator Broderip, W.J., 1833

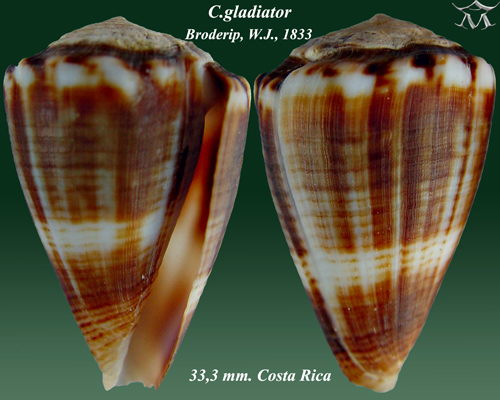
Conus gladiator Broderip, W.J., 1833

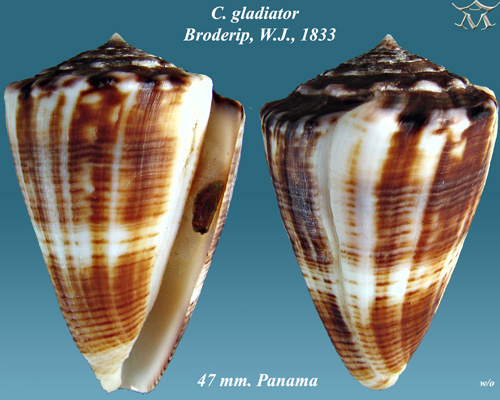
Conus gladiator Broderip, W.J., 1833
