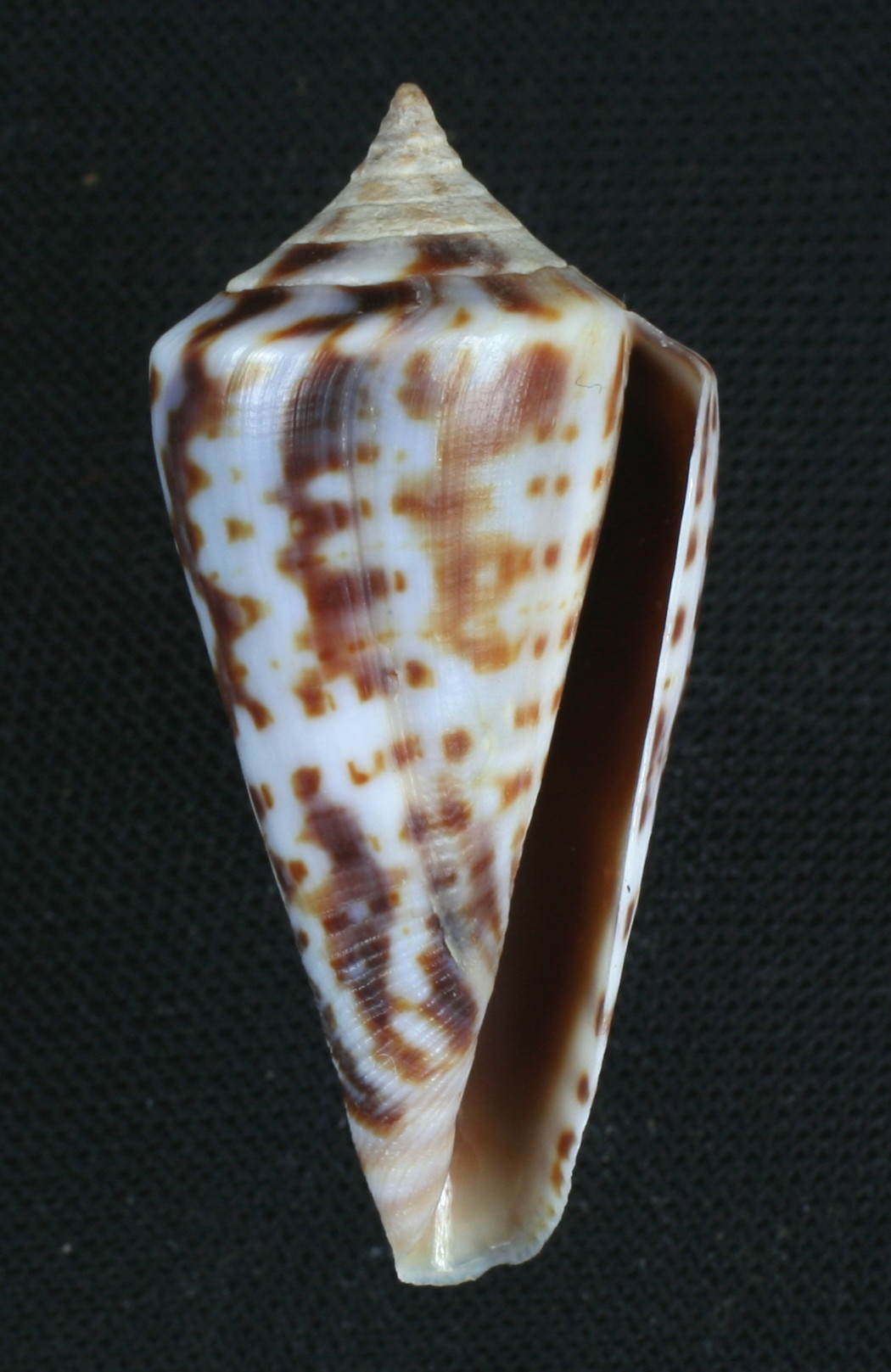
- Apertural view of shell of Conus regularis G. B. Sowerby I, 1833.

Scientific classification
- Domain: Eukaryota
- Kingdom: Animalia
- Phylum: Mollusca
- Class: Gastropoda
- Subclass: Caenogastropoda
- Order: Neogastropoda
- Superfamily: Conoidea
- Family: Conidae
- Genus: Conus
- Species: C. regularis

Binomial name
- Conus regularis G. B. Sowerby I, 1833

Synonyms
- Conus (Dauciconus) regularis G. B. Sowerby I, 1833 · accepted, alternate representation; Conus angulatus A. Adams, 1855; Conus incurvus G. B. Sowerby I, 1833; Conus magdalenensis Bartsch & Rehder, 1939; Conus syriacus G. B. Sowerby I, 1833 (junior secondary homonym of Cucullus syriacus Röding, 1798); Gradiconus regularis (G. B. Sowerby I, 1833)

= Conus regularis =

Species of sea snail

Conus regularis, common name the regular cone, is a species of sea snail, a marine gastropod mollusk in the family Conidae, the cone snails and their allies.

Like all species within the genus Conus, these marine snails are predatory and venomous. They are capable of stinging humans, therefore live ones should be handled carefully or not at all.

== Description ==
The size of the shell varies between 25 mm and 86 mm. The color of the shell is white or yellowish white, with chestnut-chocolate maculations and spots, variously arranged in revolving series. Sometimes the ground color of the shell is chestnut, with dark chocolate markings and chocolate aperture. The spire is somewhat concavely elevated, with an acute apex. The epidermis is thin, smooth and translucent.

== Distribution ==
This species occurs in the Pacific Ocean off Mexico.

== Gallery ==
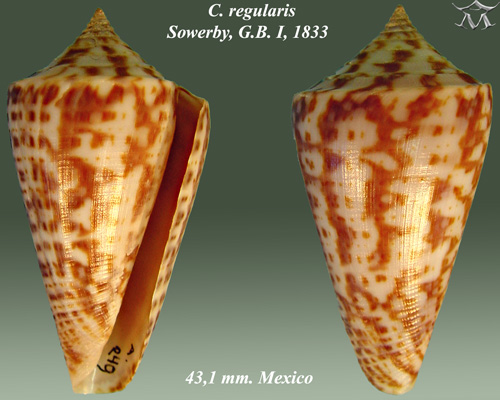
Conus regularis Sowerby, G.B. I, 1833

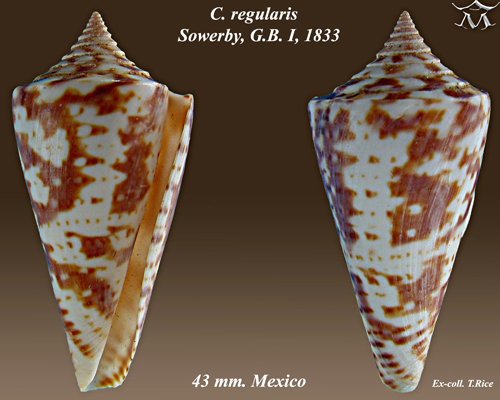
Conus regularis Sowerby, G.B. I, 1833
