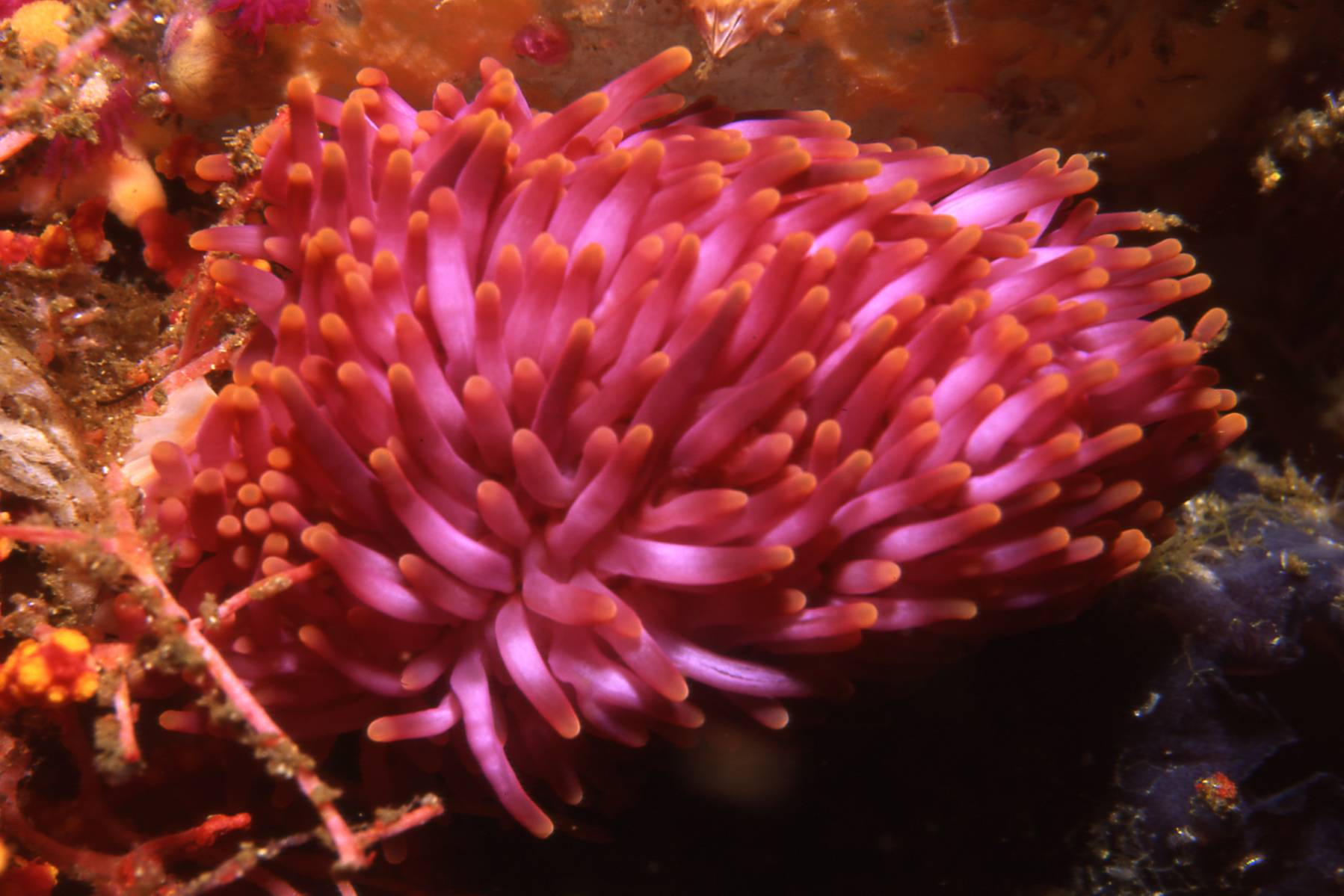
- The walking anemone, Preactis millardae

Scientific classification
- Kingdom: Animalia
- Phylum: Cnidaria
- Subphylum: Anthozoa
- Class: Hexacorallia
- Order: Actiniaria
- Superfamily: Actinioidea
- Family: Preactiniidae; England in England & Robson, 1984

Genera
- Dactylanthus; Dactylanthus antarcticus (Clubb, 1908); Preactis; Preactis millardae England in England & Robson, 1984

= Preactiniidae =

Family of sea anemones

Preactiniidae is a family of sea anemones in the order Actiniaria The family contains two species in two monotypic genera.

== List of genera ==
- genus Dactylanthus
  - Dactylanthus antarcticus (Clubb, 1908)
- genus Preactis
  - Preactis millardae England in England & Robson, 1984 ("walking anemone")
