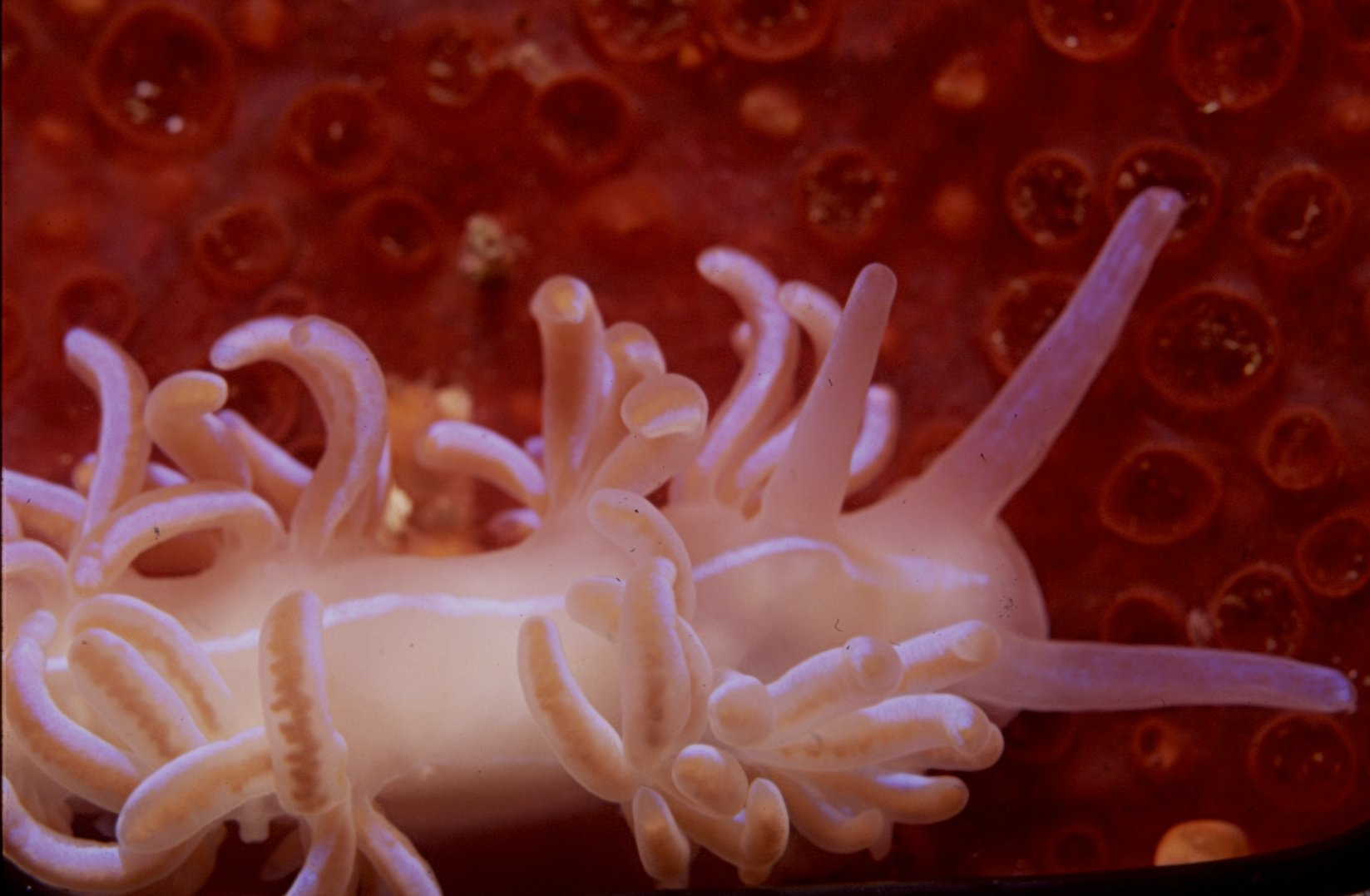

Scientific classification
- Kingdom: Animalia
- Phylum: Mollusca
- Class: Gastropoda
- Order: Nudibranchia
- Suborder: Aeolidacea
- Family: Myrrhinidae
- Genus: Phyllodesmium
- Species: P. horridum

Binomial name
- Phyllodesmium horridum (Macnae, 1954)

Synonyms
- Favorinus horridus Macnae, 1954 (basionym); Phyllodesmiopsis horridus; Phyllodesmium horridus

= Phyllodesmium horridum =

Coral nudibranch

Species of gastropod

Phyllodesmium horridum, the coral nudibranch, is a species of sea slug, specifically an aeolid nudibranch. It is a marine gastropod mollusc in the family Facelinidae.

== Distribution ==
This species is found around the South African coast from False Bay to Sodwana Bay, intertidally to at least 30 m. It has been erroneously reported from Australia and Japan due to confusion with Phyllodesmium serratum.

== Description ==
Around the South African coast, the coral nudibranch is typically between 30 and 40 mm in total length. It is a slender pale-bodied aeolid with long paired pinkish cerata. The cerata have a bluish-white stripe running down their length, as does the body. The rhinophores are smooth. This species contains no zooxanthellae.

== Ecology ==
Phyllodesmium horridum feeds on sea fans (gorgonians) of the genus Melitodes (family Melithaeidae). It has also been reported to feed on gorgonians of the genus, Acabaria (also family Melithaeidae). The egg ribbon is a gelatinous mass with many small white eggs.
