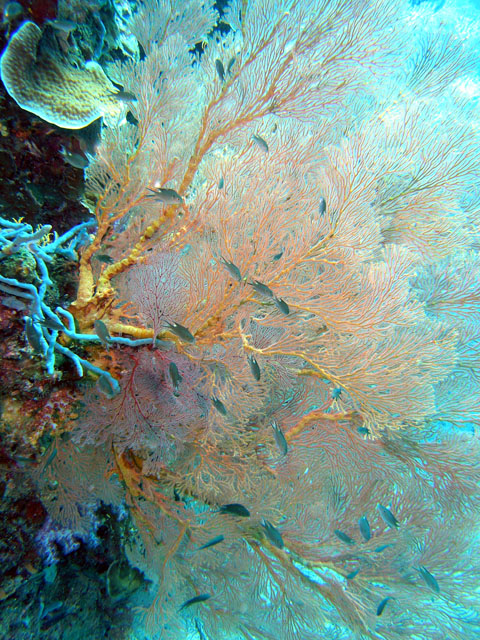
- Knotted fan coral, Melithaea ochracea

Scientific classification
- Kingdom: Animalia
- Phylum: Cnidaria
- Subphylum: Anthozoa
- Class: Octocorallia
- Order: Malacalcyonacea
- Family: Melithaeidae
- Genus: Melithaea; Milne-Edwards, 1857

Species
- See text

Synonyms
- Acabaria Gray, 1859; Birotulata Nutting, 1911; Clathraria Gray, 1859; Melitella Gray, 1859; Melitodes Verrill, 1864; Mopsella Gray, 1857; Pleurocoralloides Moroff, 1902; Wrightella Gray, 1870

= Melithaea =

Genus of corals

Melithaea is a genus of octocorals in the family Melithaeidae. Members of the genus are commonly known as fan corals and are found in the tropical Indo-Pacific region. The type species is Melithaea ochracea.

== Description ==
Members of the genus Melithaea are arborescent colonial corals forming fan, bush or tree shapes. The axis or main skeletal "trunk" is jointed, there being nodes, flexible horny joints, separated by internodes composed of hard, calcareous material. The branches divide off at the nodes which are often swollen. The minute calcareous spicules in the flexible membrane called the mesoglea that covers the skeleton are called sclerites. The identity of these spicules is important for identification purposes and in this genus they are predominantly double discs and small disc-spindles, but also include plain spindles, capstans and small clubs. Members of this genus do not have the unicellular symbiotic algae Zooxanthellae in their tissues that many other corals do. Colonies vary in colour but tend to be shades of yellow, orange, red and brown.

== Ecological significance ==
These corals are one of several genera of sea fan that can be hosts to a species of pygmy seahorse, the Denise's pygmy seahorse (Hippocampus denise).

== Species ==
The World Register of Marine Species includes the following species in the genus:

- Melithaea acuta (Gray, 1870)
- Melithaea africana (Kükenthal, 1908)
- Melithaea akalyx (Kükenthal, 1908)
- Melithaea albitincta (Ridley, 1884)
- Melithaea amboinensis (Hentschel, 1903)
- Melithaea andamanensis (van Ofwegen, 1987)
- Melithaea arborea (Kükenthal, 1908)
- Melithaea atrorubens (Gray, 1870)
- Melithaea aurantia (Esper, 1798)
- Melithaea australis (Gray, 1868)
- Melithaea baladea (Grasshoff, 1999)
- Melithaea bicolor (Nutting, 1908)
- Melithaea biserialis (Kükenthal, 1908)
- Melithaea boninensis Matsumoto & van Ofwegen, 2015
- Melithaea braueri (Kükenthal, 1919)
- Melithaea caledonica Grasshoff, 1999
- Melithaea capensis (Studer, 1878)
- Melithaea cinquemiglia (Grasshoff, 1999)
- Melithaea clavigera (Ridley, 1884)
- Melithaea coccinea (Ellis & Solander, 1786)
- Melithaea contorta (Dean, 1932)
- Melithaea corymbosa (Kükenthal, 1908)
- Melithaea delicata (Hickson, 1940)
- Melithaea dichotoma (Linnaeus, 1758)
- Melithaea divaricata (Gray, 1859)
- Melithaea doederleini Matsumoto & van Ofwegen, 2015
- Melithaea dubia (Broch, 1916)
- Melithaea ellisi (Hickson, 1937)
- Melithaea elongata (Gray, 1859)
- Melithaea erythraea (Ehrenberg, 1834)
- Melithaea esperi (Wright & Studer, 1889)
- Melithaea flabellata (Gray, 1870)
- Melithaea flabellum (Thomson & Mackinnon, 1910)
- Melithaea formosa (Nutting, 1911)
- Melithaea fragilis (Wright & Studer, 1889)
- Melithaea frondosa (Brundin, 1896)
- Melithaea furcata (Thomson, 1916)
- Melithaea gracilis (Gray, 1859)
- Melithaea gracillima (Ridley, 1884)
- Melithaea haddoni (Hickson, 1937)
- Melithaea harbereri (Kükenthal, 1908)
- Melithaea hendersoni Reijnen, McFadden, Hermanlimianto & van Ofwegen, 2014
- Melithaea hicksoni (Nutting, 1911)
- Melithaea isonoi Matsumoto & van Ofwegen, 2015
- Melithaea japonica (Verrill, 1865)
- †Melithaea keramaensis Matsumoto & van Ofwegen, 2015
- Melithaea klunzingeri (Kükenthal, 1908)
- Melithaea kuea (Grasshoff, 1999)
- Melithaea laevis (Wright & Studer, 1889)
- Melithaea linearis (Gray, 1870)
- Melithaea mabahissi (Hickson, 1940)
- Melithaea maldivensis (van Ofwegen, 1987)
- Melithaea mcqueeni Reijnen, McFadden, Hermanlimianto & van Ofwegen, 2014
- Melithaea mertoni (Kükenthal, 1909)
- Melithaea modesta (Nutting, 1911)
- Melithaea moluccana (Kükenthal, 1896)
- Melithaea mutsu (Minobe, 1929)
- Melithaea nodosa (Wright & Studer, 1889)
- Melithaea nuttingi (Hickson, 1937)
- Melithaea occidentalis Duchassaing, 1870
- Melithaea ochracea (Linnaeus, 1785)
- Melithaea omanensis (van Ofwegen, 1987)
- Melithaea ornata (Thomson & Simpson, 1909)
- Melithaea ouvea (Grasshoff, 1999)
- Melithaea oyeni Matsumoto & van Ofwegen, 2015
- Melithaea philippinensis (Wright & Studer, 1889)
- Melithaea planiloca (Ridley, 1888)
- Melithaea planoregularis (Kükenthal, 1909)
- Melithaea pulchella (Thomson & Simpson, 1909)
- Melithaea pulchra (Hickson, 1937)
- Melithaea ramulosa (Kükenthal, 1909)
- Melithaea retifera (Lamarck, 1816)
- Melithaea robusta (Shann, 1912)
- Melithaea roemeri (Kükenthal, 1908)
- Melithaea rubeola (Wright & Studer, 1889)
- Melithaea rubra (Esper, 1789)
- Melithaea rubrinodis (Gray, 1859)
- Melithaea rugosa (Wright & Studer, 1889)
- Melithaea ryukyuensis Matsumoto & van Ofwegen, 2015
- Melithaea sagamiensis Matsumoto & van Ofwegen, 2015
- Melithaea sanguinea (Kükenthal, 1908)
- Melithaea satsumaensis Matsumoto & van Ofwegen, 2015
- Melithaea serrata (Ridley, 1884)
- Melithaea shanni Reijnen, McFadden, Hermanlimianto & van Ofwegen, 2014
- Melithaea sinaica (Grasshoff, 2000)
- Melithaea singularis (Thomson, 1916)
- Melithaea sinuata (Wright & Studer, 1889)
- Melithaea spinosa (Kükenthal, 1878)
- Melithaea splendens (Nutting, 1911)
- Melithaea spongiosa (Nutting, 1911)
- Melithaea squamata (Nutting, 1911)
- Melithaea squarrosa (Kükenthal, 1909)
- Melithaea stiasnyi (van Ofwegen, 1989)
- Melithaea stormii (Studer, 1895)
- Melithaea studeri (Nutting, 1911)
- Melithaea suensoni Matsumoto & van Ofwegen, 2015
- Melithaea superba (Kükenthal, 1919)
- Melithaea tanseii Matsumoto & van Ofwegen, 2015
- Melithaea tenella (Dana, 1846)
- Melithaea tenuis (Kükenthal, 1908)
- Melithaea textiformis (Lamarck, 1815)
- Melithaea thomsoni (Broch, 1916)
- Melithaea thorpeae Reijnen, McFadden, Hermanlimianto & van Ofwegen, 2014
- Melithaea tokaraensis Matsumoto & van Ofwegen, 2015
- Melithaea tongaensis (Kükenthal, 1908)
- Melithaea triangulata (Nutting, 1911)
- Melithaea trilineata (Thomson, 1917)
- Melithaea undulata (Kükenthal, 1908)
- Melithaea valdiviae (Kükenthal, 1908)
- Melithaea variabilis (Hickson, 1905)
- Melithaea virgata (Verrill, 1846)
- Melithaea wrighti Reijnen, McFadden, Hermanlimianto & van Ofwegen, 2014
- Melithaea zimmeri (Kükenthal, 1908)
