= Epidermis (disambiguation) =

Epidermis is the outermost layer of the skin of a human or other vertebrate animal.

Epidermis may also refer to:

- Epidermis (botany), the outermost cell layer of plants
- Epidermis (zoology), the sheet of cells that covers the body of all animals more complex than sponges
