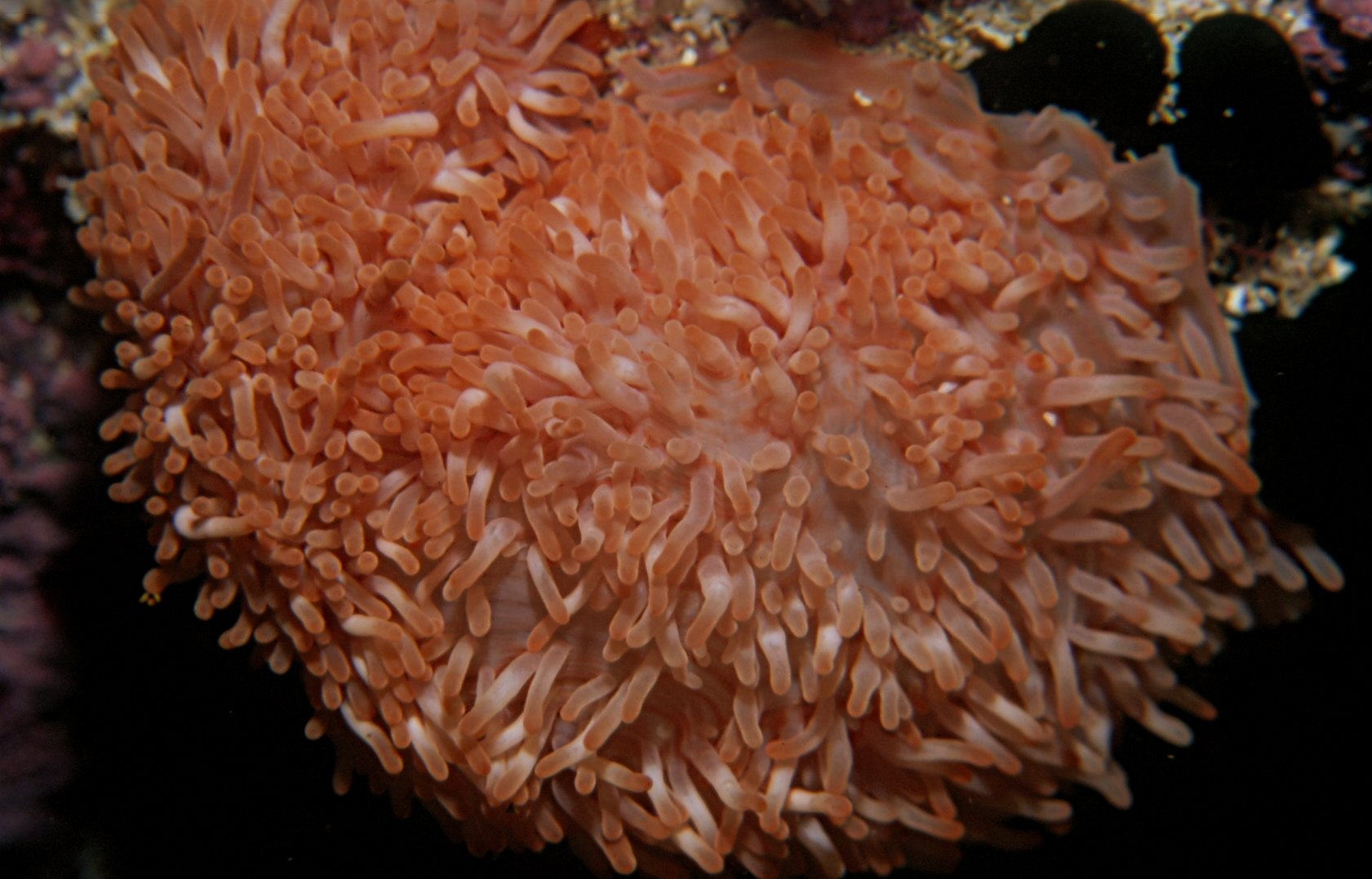

Scientific classification
- Domain: Eukaryota
- Kingdom: Animalia
- Phylum: Cnidaria
- Subphylum: Anthozoa
- Class: Hexacorallia
- Order: Actiniaria
- Family: Preactiniidae
- Genus: Preactis
- Species: P. millardae

Binomial name
- Preactis millardae England in England & Robson, 1984

= Walking anemone =

Species of cnidarian

The walking anemone (Preactis millardae), also known as the hedgehog anemone or sock anemone, is a species of sea anemones in the order Actiniaria. It is the only member of its genus, Preactis.

== Description ==
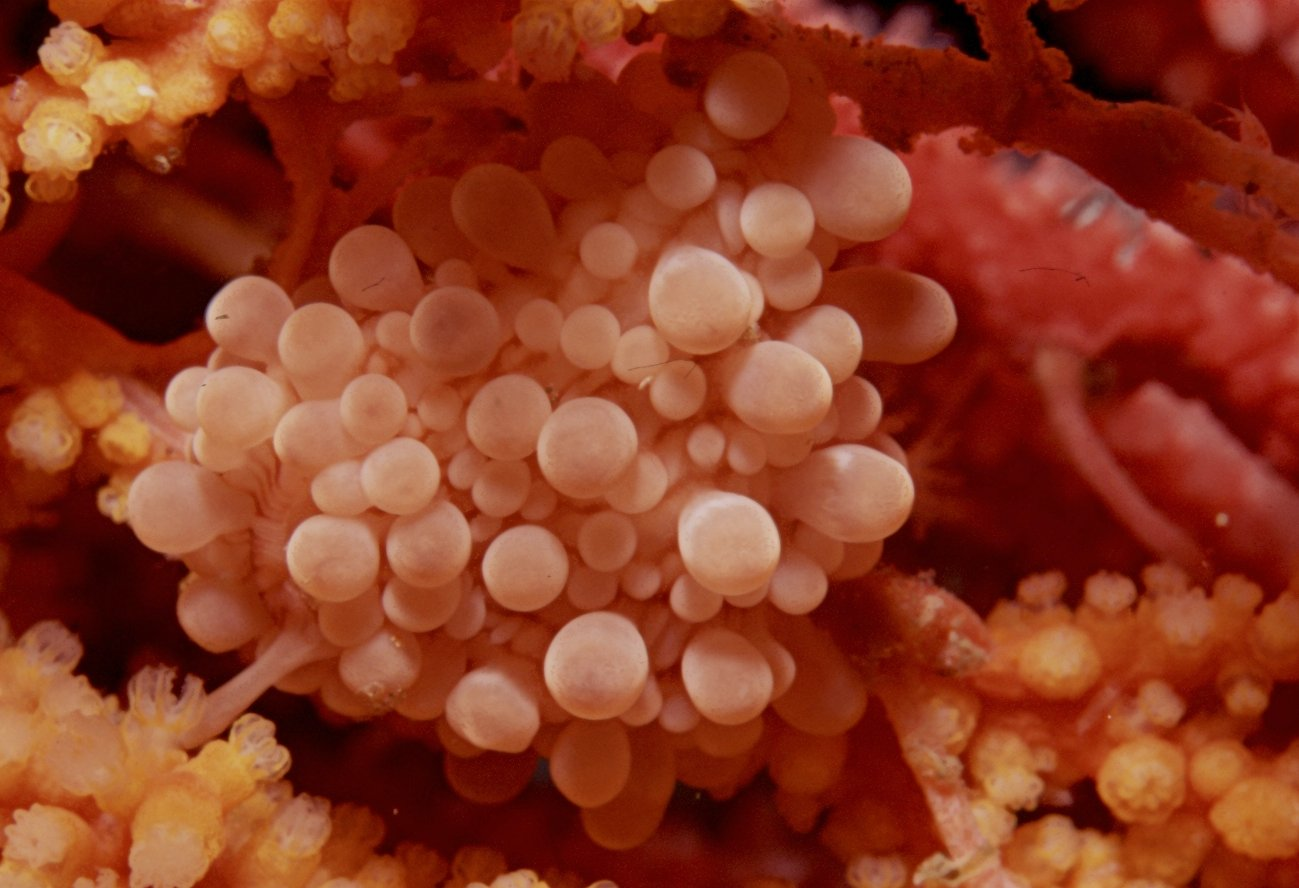
a juvenile walking anemone

The walking anemone is an unusual looking anemone, which may grow to up to 6 cm in diameter and 30 cm in length. It has papillae covering its whole body column. Scarlet lines radiate outwards from the mouth and can be seen on the body between papillae. The background colour of the body is pale. Juveniles are pale or white in colour and have protruding rounded swellings on their bodies instead of papillae.

== Distribution ==
This anemone has only been found on both sides of the Cape Peninsula in South Africa. It is endemic to this area. It has been found from 10 to 30 m underwater.

== Ecology ==
This anemone 'walks' rather like a leech does, by creeping. It is usually found on vertical rock walls, although it may sometimes be found on sand patches. It is a voracious predator of the multicoloured sea fan, Acabaria rubra, and is often found eating these animals, which it consumes down to the skeletal support.
