= Polypodiidae =

Polypodiidae may refer to:

- Polypodiidae (cnidarians), a zoological family that only includes Polypodium hydriforme, a cnidarian parasite of fish eggs
- Polypodiidae (plant), a botanical subclass of Equisetopsida sensu lato that includes the leptosporangiate ferns
- Polypodiidae a botanical subclass that only includes the fern family Osmundaceae
