= Dactylanthus antarcticus =

Scientific classification
- Domain: Eukaryota
- Kingdom: Animalia
- Phylum: Cnidaria
- Class: Hexacorallia
- Order: Actiniaria
- Family: Preactiniidae
- Genus: Dactylanthus; Carlgren, 1911
- Species: D. antarcticus

Binomial name
- Dactylanthus antarcticus (Clubb, 1908)

Species of sea anemone

Dactylanthus antarcticus is a species of sea anemones in the order Actiniaria. It is the only member of its genus.

== Distribution ==
This anemone has been found from King George Island off Antarctica and the Strait of Magellan in Chile.
