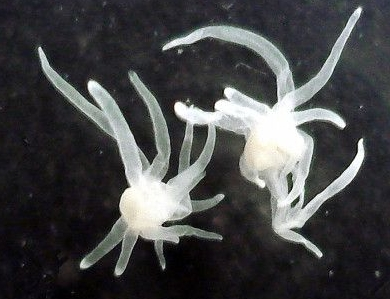
- Two specimens of free-living Polypodium

Scientific classification
- Kingdom: Animalia
- Phylum: Cnidaria
- Class: Polypodiozoa; Raikova, 1988
- Order: Polypodiidea; Poche, 1914
- Family: Polypodiidae; Poche, 1914
- Genus: Polypodium; Ussov, 1885
- Species: P. hydriforme

Binomial name
- Polypodium hydriforme (Ussov, 1885)

= Polypodium hydriforme =

Species of marine parasites

Polypodium hydriforme is a species of Cnidarian that parasitizes in the eggs of sturgeon and similar fishes (Acipenseridae and Polyodontidae). It is one of few animals that lives inside the cells of other animals. P. hydriforme is the only species in the class Polypodiozoa.

== Taxonomy ==
The unusual characteristics of Polypodium have led to much controversy regarding its phylogenetic position within the metazoans.

Polypodium has traditionally been considered a cnidarian because it possesses nematocysts, the stinging structures characteristic of cnidarians. Molecular phylogenetic studies using 18S rDNA sequence data temporarily challenged this interpretation, uncovering that Polypodium is a close relative to myxozoans and suggesting that together they share a closer affinity to bilaterians than cnidarians. Due to the variable rates of 18S rDNA sequences, these results were suggested to be an artifact of long branch attraction, and myxozoans have also been classified within cnidarians.

Evans et al. (2008) performed phylogenetic analyses of metazoans with 18S and partial 28S rDNA sequences in a large dataset that includes Polypodium and a comprehensive sampling of cnidarian taxa. This supports the placement of Polypodium within Cnidaria. This accords with its traditional classification, in particular with the fact that Polypodium possesses nematocysts and a cnidarian-like body plan. Myxozoans are currently classified as cnidarians as well.

== Description and life cycle ==
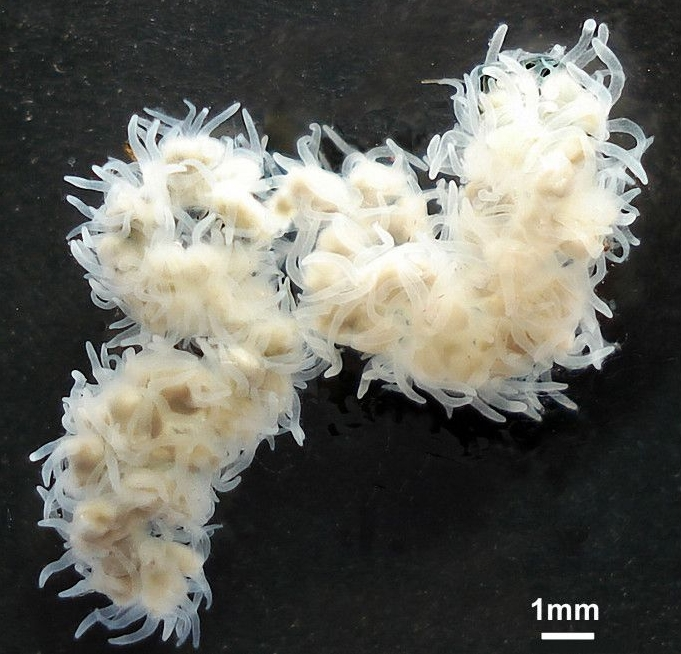
Free living stolon.

Polypodium was discovered in 1871 by M.M. Owsiannikov within the eggs of sterlet (Acipenser ruthenus) from the Volga river in Russia. In 1885, Ussov named the species Polypodium hydriforme and gave a morphological description of the parasite. Polypodium was long considered a unique intracellular parasite among cnidarians. Its hosts include 14 species of Acipenser, two species of Huso, the American paddlefish, and the shovelnose sturgeon.

Polypodium hydriforme is an endocellular parasite with an unusual life cycle, a peculiar morphology, and high rates of DNA evolution. Polypodium spends most of its life inside the oocytes of acipenseriform fishes. In infected oocytes, Polypodium develops from a binucleate cell into an inside-out planuliform larva and then into an elongate inside-out stolon; the epidermal cell layer is located internal to the body and the gastrodermis is located externally. The embryo, larva and stolon are surrounded by a protective polyploid cell, which also functions in digestion. Just prior to host spawning, Polypodium everts to the normal position of cell layers, revealing tentacles scattered along the stolon. During eversion, the yolk of the host oocyte fills the gastral cavities of the parasite, supplying the future free-living stage with nutrients. The parasitic phase of its life cycle usually takes several years. Finally, upon emerging from the host egg in fresh water, the free-living stolon fragments into individual medusoid-like organisms that go on to multiply by means of longitudinal fission. In summer they form endodermal sexual organs: "female" ones showing ovaria and gonoducts, and "male" ones with simpler organization. "Female" gonads are supposedly abortive; the "male" ones ultimately produce binucleate cells and become gametophores which infect host fish. Polypodium hydriforme displays many peculiar characteristics, some of them shared with myxozoa.

== Habitat ==
The habitat of Polypodium hydriforme is freshwater. Although freshwater is an unusual habitat for cnidarians, it is not unheard of, especially within hydrozoans. For instance, the model organism Hydra and the jellyfish Craspedacusta sowerbii are both exclusively freshwater hydrozoans. Hydra and Craspedacusta sowerbii are not closely related to Polypodium. Also, the obligate parasite Myxobolus cerebralis lives in freshwater. Thus, it appears that in the evolution of cnidarians, invasion of freshwater habitats has happened at least three separate times.
