= MacNae =

MacNae or McNae is a surname. Notable people with the surname include:

- Andy MacNae (born 1965), British politician
- William Macnae (1914–1975), South African zoologist and malacologist
- Ross McNae (fl. 2007), member of Twin Atlantic
