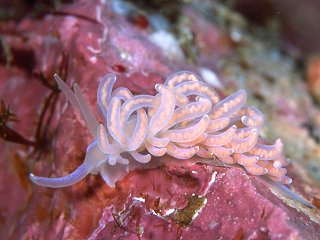
- Phyllodesmium serratum, Izu, Japan

Scientific classification
- Kingdom: Animalia
- Phylum: Mollusca
- Class: Gastropoda
- Order: Nudibranchia
- Suborder: Aeolidacea
- Family: Myrrhinidae
- Genus: Phyllodesmium
- Species: P. serratum

Binomial name
- Phyllodesmium serratum (Baba, 1949)

Synonyms
- Hervia serrata Baba, 1949; Cratena serrata; Babaiella serrata; Phyllodesmium serrata

= Phyllodesmium serratum =

Species of gastropod

Phyllodesmium serratum is a species of sea slug, an aeolid nudibranch, a marine gastropod mollusc in the family Facelinidae.

== Distribution ==
The distribution of Phyllodesmium serratum includes Australia and Japan. It has been erroneously synonymised with Phyllodesmium horridum by some authors but does not occur in Africa.

== Description ==
The length of the slug is usually 10–25 mm, but its length can reach up to 40 mm.

This species contains no zooxanthellae.

== Ecology ==
Phyllodesmium serratum feeds on the soft corals Cornularia sp., Clavularia sp., Carijoa sp. and Steronephthya sp.
