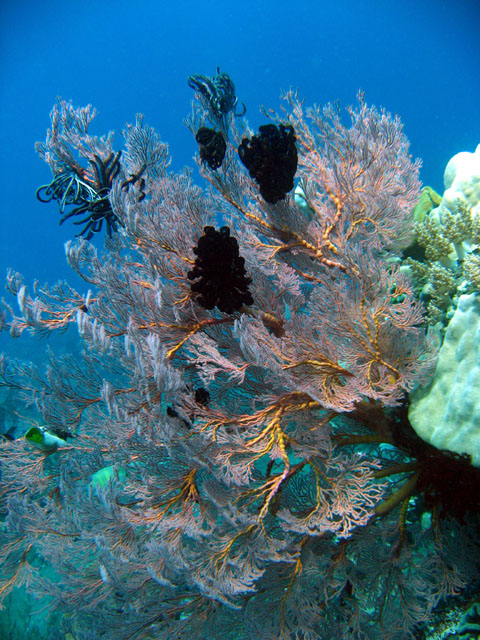
- Melithaea ochracea at Bali, Indonesia

Scientific classification
- Kingdom: Animalia
- Phylum: Cnidaria
- Subphylum: Anthozoa
- Class: Octocorallia
- Order: Malacalcyonacea
- Family: Melithaeidae; Gray, 1870

Genera
- See text

Synonyms
- Melithaeadae Gray, 1870; Melitodidae Verrill, 1869; Mopselladae Gray, 1870

= Melithaeidae =

Family of corals

Melithaeidae is a family of corals in the order Malacalcyonacea. Members of the family are commonly known as sea fans and are found on reefs in the tropical regions of the Indo-Pacific.

== Description ==
Members of the family Melithaeidae are arborescent colonial corals forming fans, bushes or trees. The axis or main skeletal "trunk" is jointed, there being nodes, flexible horny joints, separated by internodes composed of hard, calcareous material. The branches divide dichotomously at the nodes and these are often swollen. The minute calcareous spicules in the flexible membrane called the mesoglea that covers the skeleton are called sclerites. The exact shape of these spicules is important for identification purposes and in this family there are a range of different sclerites including foliate capstans and spheroids, plain spindles, plain capstans and small and large clubs. Members of this family do not have the unicellular symbiotic algae Zooxanthellae that grows in the tissues of many other corals.

== Genera ==
The World Register of Marine Species includes the following genera in the family:

- Asperaxis Alderslade, 2007
- Melithaea Milne-Edwards, 1857
