= Mesoglea =

Substance found in cnidarians

Mesoglea refers to the extracellular matrix found in cnidarians like coral or jellyfish as well as ctenophores that functions as a hydrostatic skeleton. It is related to but distinct from mesohyl, which generally refers to extracellular material found in sponges.

== Description ==
The mesoglea is mostly water. Other than water, the mesoglea is composed of several substances including fibrous proteins, like collagen and heparan sulfate proteoglycans. The mesoglea is mostly acellular, but in both Cnidaria and Ctenophora the mesoglea contains muscle bundles and nerve fibres. Other nerve and muscle cells lie just under the epithelial layers. The mesoglea also contains wandering amoebocytes that play a role in phagocytosing debris and bacteria. These cells also fight infections by producing antibacterial chemicals.

The mesoglea may be thinner than either of the cell layers in smaller coelenterates like a hydra or may make up the bulk of the body in larger jellyfish. The mesoglea serves as an internal skeleton, supporting the body. Its elastic properties help restore the shape after it is deformed by the contraction of muscles. However, without the buoyancy of water to support it, the mesoglea is not stiff enough to bear the weight of the body and coelenterates generally tend to flatten out, or even collapse when they are taken out of water.

The mesoglea is sandwiched between the epidermis and the gastrodermis. In some jellyfish the epidermis on the umbrella/bell surface seems to break off when the jellyfish grows so the mesoglea of older jellyfish is directly exposed to the water.

The mesoglea itself consists of multiple layers that can be differentiated by their electron density. The most prominent of these are the basal lamina and the interstitial matrix.

== Uses of the term ==
In order to differentiate the use of the word mesenchyme in vertebrate embryology (that is, undifferentiated tissue found in embryonic true [ento-]mesoderm from which are derived all connective tissues, blood vessels, blood cells, the lymphatic system, and the heart) and the use in invertebrate zoology (a more-or-less solid but loosely organized tissue consisting of a gel matrix [the mesoglea, in strict sense] with various cellular and fibrous inclusions, located between epidermis and gastrodermis), some authors prefer to use the term mesoglea (in wider sense) in lieu of mesenchyme when referring to the middle layers of sponges and diploblasts, reserving the term mesenchyme for the embryological sense. However, Brusca & Brusca (2003) discourage this usage, using mesoglea in its strict sense, and preferring to maintain both the embryological and zoological senses for the term mesenchyme.

== See also ==
- Anatomy of corals
