= Gastrodermis =

Layer of cells that line the gastrovascular cavity of Cnidarians

Cross section of jellyfish. The gastrodermis is numbered 3.

Gastrodermis (from Ancient Greek: γαστήρ, gastḗr, "stomach"; δέρμα, dérma, "skin") is the inner layer of cells that serves as a lining membrane of the gastrovascular cavity in cnidarians. It is distinct from the outer epidermis and the inner dermis and is primarily associated with the ventral side of cnidarians. It is composed of specialized cells responsible for several vital physiological processes. The term is also used for the analogous inner epithelial layer of ctenophores.

== Functions ==
The gastrodermis has a role in many biological functions, including respiration, pigmentation, and digestion.

- The gastrodermis provides a large surface area for gas exchange to occur, via cutaneous respiration, which involves the exchange of oxygen and carbon dioxide through the skin.
- The gastrodermis contains specialised cells called chromatophores, which are responsible for producing and controlling pigmentation. These cells contain pigments such as melanin that help in coloration and camouflage.
- In coelenterates, the gastrodermis contains mucus-secreting cells and gland cells that secrete digestive enzymes to assist in digestion.
- The gastrodermis is among the sites where early signals of heat stress are expressed in corals.
