= Epidermis (zoology) =

Sheet of cells that covers the body of a eumetazoan

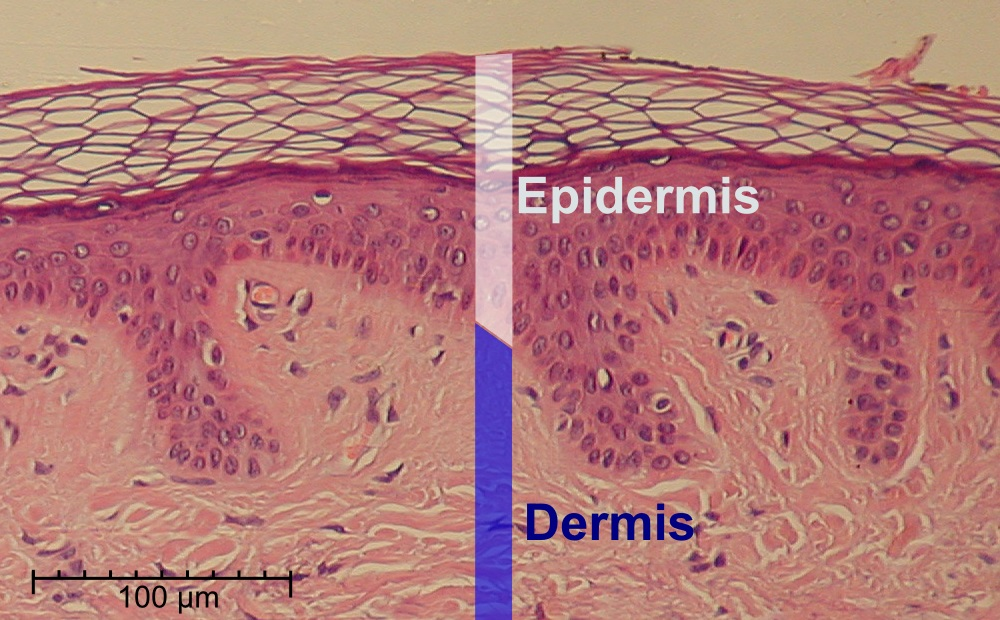
Epidermis-delimited

In zoology, the epidermis is an epithelium (sheet of cells) that covers the body of a eumetazoan (all animals except sponges). Eumetazoa have a cavity lined with a similar epithelium, the gastrodermis, which forms a boundary with the epidermis at the mouth.

Sponges have no epithelium, and therefore no epidermis or gastrodermis. The epidermis of a more complex invertebrate is just one layer deep, and may be protected by a non-cellular cuticle. The epidermis of a higher vertebrate has many layers, and the outer layers are reinforced with keratin and then die.
