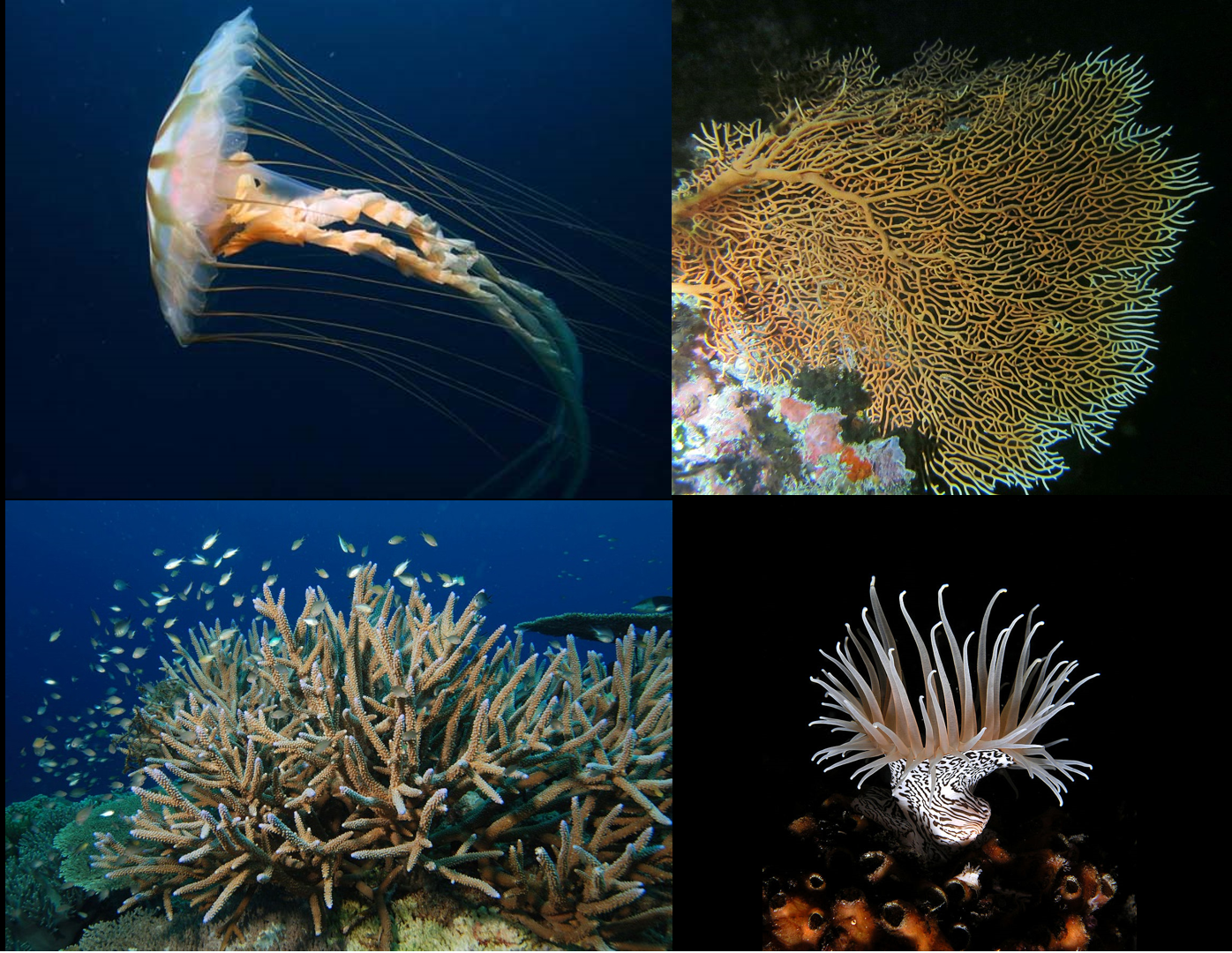
- Four examples of cnidaria (clockwise, from top left): A jellyfish Chrysaora melanaster; A gorgonian Annella mollis; A sea anemone Nemanthus annamensis; A stony coral Acropora cervicornis

Scientific classification
- Kingdom: Animalia
- Subkingdom: Eumetazoa
- Clade: ParaHoxozoa
- Clade: Planulozoa
- Phylum: Cnidaria; Hatschek, 1888

Subphyla and classes
- Subphylum Anthozoa—anthozoans; Class Octocorallia—sea pens, gorgonians, and some corals; Class Hexacorallia—sea and tube anemones, black corals, etc.; Unranked clade Operculozoa; Subphylum Medusozoa—medusae; Class Cubozoa—box jellyfish, sea wasps; Class Hydrozoa—hydrae, hydroids, chondrophores, siphonophores...; Class Scyphozoa—true jellyfish; Class Staurozoa—stalked jellyfish; Subphylum Endocnidozoa—endoparasites; Class Myxozoa—myxozoans; Class Polypodiozoa—Polypodium hydriforme

= Cnidaria =

Cnidaria Temporal range: 600–0 Ma Ediacaran–Present

Aquatic animal phylum having cnidocytes

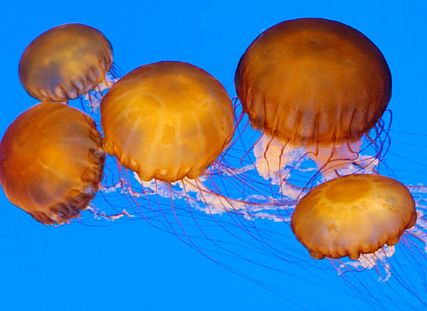
Pacific sea nettles, Chrysaora fuscescens

Cnidaria (/nɪˈdɛəriə, naɪ-/ nih-DAIR-ee-ə, ny-) is a phylum of animals containing over 11,000 species of aquatic invertebrates found both in freshwater and marine environments (predominantly the latter), including jellyfish, hydrozoans, sea anemones, corals and some of the smallest marine parasites. Their distinguishing features are a simple nerve net distributed throughout a gelatinous body, and the presence of cnidocytes or cnidoblasts, specialized cells with ejectable organelles used mainly for envenomation and capturing prey. Their bodies consist of mesoglea, a non-living, jelly-like substance, sandwiched between two layers of epithelium that are mostly one cell thick. Many cnidarian species can reproduce both sexually and asexually.

Cnidarians mostly have two basic body forms: swimming medusae and sessile polyps, both of which are radially symmetrical with mouths surrounded by tentacles that bear cnidocytes, which are specialized stinging cells used to capture prey. Both forms are monostomatic, meaning they have a single orifice and body cavity that are used for digestion and respiration. Many cnidarian species produce colonies that are single organisms composed of medusa-like or polyp-like zooids, or both (hence they are trimorphic). Cnidarians' activities are coordinated by a decentralized nerve net and simple receptors. Cnidarians also have rhopalia, which are involved in gravity sensing and sometimes chemoreception. Several free-swimming species of Cubozoa and Scyphozoa possess balance-sensing statocysts, and some have simple eyes. Not all cnidarians reproduce sexually, but many species have complex life cycles of asexual polyp stages and sexual medusae stages. Some, however, omit either the polyp or the medusa stage, and the parasitic classes evolved to have neither form.

Cnidarians were formerly grouped with ctenophores, also known as comb jellies, in the phylum Coelenterata, but increasing awareness of their differences caused them to be placed in separate phyla. Most cnidarians are classified into four main groups: the almost wholly sessile Anthozoa (sea anemones, corals, sea pens); swimming Scyphozoa (jellyfish); Cubozoa (box jellies); and Hydrozoa (a diverse group that includes all the freshwater cnidarians as well as many marine forms, and which has both sessile members, such as Hydra, and colonial swimmers (such as the Portuguese man o' war). Staurozoa have recently been recognised as a class in their own right rather than a sub-group of Scyphozoa, and the highly derived parasitic Myxozoa and Polypodiozoa were firmly recognized as cnidarians only in 2007.

Most cnidarians prey on organisms ranging in size from plankton to animals several times larger than themselves, but many obtain much of their nutrition from symbiotic dinoflagellates, and a few are parasites. Many are preyed on by other animals including starfish, sea slugs, fish, turtles, and even other cnidarians. Many scleractinian corals—which form the structural foundation for coral reefs—possess polyps that are filled with symbiotic photo-synthetic zooxanthellae. While reef-forming corals are almost entirely restricted to warm and shallow marine waters, other cnidarians can be found at great depths, in polar regions, and in freshwater.

Cnidarians are a very ancient phylum, with fossils having been found in rocks formed about 580 million years ago during the Ediacaran period, preceding the Cambrian Explosion. Other fossils show that corals may have been present shortly before 490 million years ago and diversified a few million years later. Molecular clock analysis of mitochondrial genes suggests an even older age for the crown group of cnidarians, estimated around 741 million years ago, almost 200 million years before the Cambrian period, as well as before any fossils. Recent phylogenetic analyses support monophyly of cnidarians, as well as the position of cnidarians as the sister group of bilaterians.

== Etymology ==
The term cnidaria derives from the Ancient Greek word knídē (κνίδη "nettle"), signifying the coiled thread reminiscent of cnidocytes.

== Distinguishing features ==
Cnidarians form a phylum of animals that are more complex than sponges, about as complex as ctenophores (comb jellies), and less complex than bilaterians, which include almost all other animals. Both cnidarians and ctenophores are more complex than sponges as they have: cells bound by inter-cell connections and carpet-like basement membranes; muscles; nervous systems; and some have sensory organs. Cnidarians are distinguished from all other animals by having cnidocytes that fire harpoon-like structures that are mainly used to capture prey. In some species, cnidocytes can also be used as anchors. Cnidarians are also distinguished by the fact that they have only one opening in their body for ingestion and excretion i.e. they do not have a separate mouth and anus.

Like sponges and ctenophores, cnidarians have two main layers of cells that sandwich a middle layer of jelly-like material, which is called the mesoglea in cnidarians; more complex animals have three main cell layers and no intermediate jelly-like layer. Hence, cnidarians and ctenophores have traditionally been labelled diploblastic, along with sponges. However, both cnidarians and ctenophores have a type of muscle that, in more complex animals, arises from the middle cell layer. As a result, some recent text books classify ctenophores as triploblastic, and it has been suggested that cnidarians evolved from triploblastic ancestors.

	Sponges	Cnidarians	Ctenophores	Bilateria
Cnidocytes	No	Yes	No	
Colloblasts	No		Yes	No
Digestive and circulatory organs	No			Yes
Number of main cell layers	Two, with jelly-like layer between them	Two	Two	Three
Cells in each layer bound together	cell-adhesion molecules, but no basement membranes except Homoscleromorpha.	inter-cell connections; basement membranes		
Sensory organs	No	Yes		
Number of cells in middle "jelly" layer	Many	Few		(Not applicable)
Cells in outer layers can move inwards and change functions	Yes	No		(Not applicable)
Nervous system	No	Yes, simple		Simple to complex
Muscles	None	Mostly epitheliomuscular	Mostly myoepithelial	Mostly myocytes

== Description ==
=== Basic body forms ===

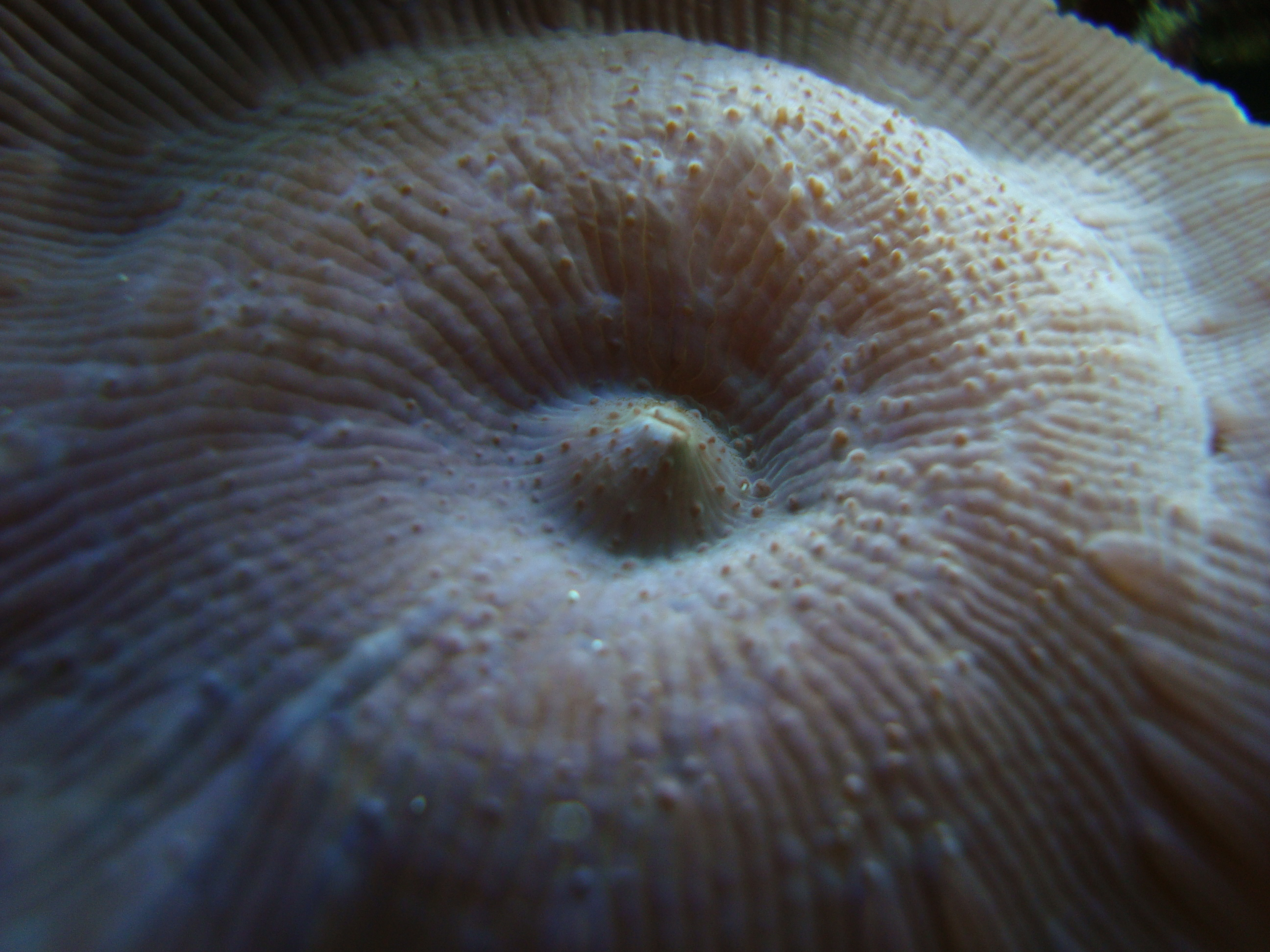
Oral end of actinodiscus polyp

Most adult cnidarians appear as either free-swimming medusae or sessile polyps, and many hydrozoanns species are known to alternate between the two forms.

Both are radially symmetrical, like a wheel and a tube respectively. Since these animals have no heads, their ends are described as "oral" (nearest the mouth) and "aboral" (furthest from the mouth).

Most have fringes of tentacles equipped with cnidocytes around their edges, and medusae generally have an inner ring of tentacles around the mouth. Some hydrozoans may consist of colonies of zooids that serve different purposes, such as defence, reproduction and catching prey. The mesoglea of polyps is usually thin and often soft, but that of medusae is usually thick and springy, so that it returns to its original shape after muscles around the edge have contracted to squeeze water out, enabling medusae to swim by a sort of jet propulsion.

=== Skeletons ===
In medusae, the only supporting structure is the mesoglea. Hydra and most sea anemones close their mouths when they are not feeding, and the water in the digestive cavity then acts as a hydrostatic skeleton, rather like a water-filled balloon. Other polyps such as Tubularia use columns of water-filled cells for support. Sea pens stiffen the mesoglea with calcium carbonate spicules and tough fibrous proteins, rather like sponges.

In some colonial polyps, a chitinous epidermis gives support and some protection to the connecting sections and to the lower parts of individual polyps. A few polyps collect materials such as sand grains and shell fragments, which they attach to their outsides. Some colonial sea anemones stiffen the mesoglea with sediment particles.

A mineralized exoskeleton made of calcium carbonate is found in subphylum Anthozoa in the order Scleractinia (stony corals; class Hexacorallia) and the class Octocorallia, and in subphylum Medusozoa in three hydrozoan families in order Anthoathecata; Milleporidae, Stylasteridae and Hydractiniidae (the latter with a mix of calcified and uncalcified species).

=== Main cell layers ===
Cnidaria are diploblastic animals; in other words, they have two main cell layers, while more complex animals are triploblasts having three main layers. The two main cell layers of cnidarians form epithelia that are mostly one cell thick, and are attached to a fibrous basement membrane, which they secrete. They also secrete the jelly-like mesoglea that separates the layers. The layer that faces outwards, known as the ectoderm ("outside skin"), generally contains the following types of cells:

- Epitheliomuscular cells whose bodies form part of the epithelium but whose bases extend to form muscle fibers in parallel rows. The fibers of the outward-facing cell layer generally run at right angles to the fibers of the inward-facing one. In Anthozoa (anemones, corals, etc.) and Scyphozoa (jellyfish), the mesoglea also contains some muscle cells.
- Cnidocytes, the harpoon-like "nettle cells" that give the phylum Cnidaria its name. These appear between or sometimes on top of the muscle cells.
- Nerve cells. Sensory cells appear between or sometimes on top of the muscle cells, and communicate via synapses (gaps across which chemical signals flow) with motor nerve cells, which lie mostly between the bases of the muscle cells. Some form a simple nerve net.
- Interstitial cells, which are unspecialized and can replace lost or damaged cells by transforming into the appropriate types. These are found between the bases of muscle cells.

In addition to epitheliomuscular, nerve and interstitial cells, the inward-facing gastroderm ("stomach skin") contains gland cells that secrete digestive enzymes. In some species it also contains low concentrations of cnidocytes, which are used to subdue prey that is still struggling.

The mesoglea contains small numbers of amoeba-like cells, and muscle cells in some species. However, the number of middle-layer cells and types are much lower than in sponges.

=== Polymorphism ===
Polymorphism refers to the occurrence of structurally and functionally more than two different types of individuals within the same organism. It is a characteristic feature of cnidarians, particularly the polyp and medusa forms, or of zooids within colonial organisms like those in Hydrozoa. In hydrozoans, colonial individuals arising from individual zooids will take on separate tasks. For example, in Obelia there are feeding individuals, the gastrozooids; the individuals capable of asexual reproduction only, the gonozooids, blastostyles and free-living or sexually reproducing individuals, the medusae.

=== Cnidocytes ===
These "nettle cells" function as harpoons, since their payloads remain connected to the bodies of the cells by threads. Three types of cnidocytes are known:

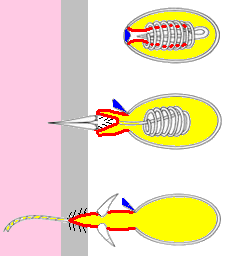
Firing sequence of the cnida in a hydra's nematocyst Operculum (lid) "Finger" that turns inside out / / / Barbs Venom Victim's skin Victim's tissues

- Nematocysts inject venom into prey, and usually have barbs to keep them embedded in the victims. Most species have nematocysts.
- Spirocysts do not penetrate the victim or inject venom, but entangle it by means of small sticky hairs on the thread.
- Ptychocysts are not used for prey capture — instead the threads of discharged ptychocysts are used for building protective tubes in which their owners live. Ptychocysts are found only in the order Ceriantharia, tube anemones.

The main components of a cnidocyte are:

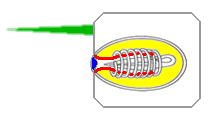
A hydra's nematocyst, before firing. "trigger" cilium

- A cilium (fine hair) which projects above the surface and acts as a trigger. Spirocysts do not have cilia.
- A tough capsule, the cnida, which houses the thread, its payload and a mixture of chemicals that may include venom or adhesives or both. ("cnida" is derived from the Greek word κνίδη, which means "nettle")
- A tube-like extension of the wall of the cnida that points into the cnida, like the finger of a rubber glove pushed inwards. When a cnidocyte fires, the finger pops out. If the cell is a venomous nematocyte, the "finger"'s tip reveals a set of barbs that anchor it in the prey.
- The thread, which is an extension of the "finger" and coils round it until the cnidocyte fires. The thread is usually hollow and delivers chemicals from the cnida to the target.
- An operculum (lid) over the end of the cnida. The lid may be a single hinged flap or three flaps arranged like slices of pie.
- The cell body, which produces all the other parts.

It is difficult to study the firing mechanisms of cnidocytes as these structures are small but very complex. At least four hypotheses have been proposed:

- Rapid contraction of fibers round the cnida may increase its internal pressure.
- The thread may be like a coiled spring that extends rapidly when released.
- In the case of Chironex (the "sea wasp"), chemical changes in the cnida's contents may cause them to expand rapidly by polymerization.
- Chemical changes in the liquid in the cnida make it a much more concentrated solution, so that osmotic pressure forces water in very rapidly to dilute it. This mechanism has been observed in nematocysts of the class Hydrozoa, sometimes producing pressures as high as 140 atmospheres, similar to that of scuba air tanks, and fully extending the thread in as little as 2 milliseconds (0.002 second).

Cnidocytes can only fire once, and about 25% of a hydra's nematocysts are lost from its tentacles when capturing a brine shrimp. Used cnidocytes have to be replaced, which takes about 48 hours. To minimise wasteful firing, two types of stimulus are generally required to trigger cnidocytes: nearby sensory cells detect chemicals in the water, and their cilia respond to contact. This combination prevents them from firing at distant or non-living objects. Groups of cnidocytes are usually connected by nerves and, if one fires, the rest of the group requires a weaker minimum stimulus than the cells that fire first.

=== Locomotion ===
A swimming sea nettle known as the purple-striped jelly (Chrysaora colorata)

Medusae swim by a form of jet propulsion: muscles, especially inside the rim of the bell, squeeze water out of the cavity inside the bell, and the springiness of the mesoglea powers the recovery stroke. Since the tissue layers are very thin, they provide too little power to swim against currents and just enough to control movement within currents.

Hydras and some sea anemones can move slowly over rocks and sea or stream beds by various means: creeping like snails, crawling like inchworms, or by somersaulting. A few can swim clumsily by waggling their bases.

=== Nervous system and senses ===
Cnidarians are generally thought to have no brains or even central nervous systems. However, they do have integrative areas of neural tissue that could be considered some form of centralization. Most of their bodies are innervated by decentralized nerve nets that control their swimming musculature and connect with sensory structures, though each clade has slightly different structures. These sensory structures, usually called rhopalia, can generate signals in response to various types of stimuli such as light, pressure, chemical changes, and much more. Medusa usually have several of them around the margin of the bell that work together to control the motor nerve net, that directly innervates the swimming muscles. Most cnidarians also have a parallel system. In scyphozoans, this takes the form of a diffuse nerve net, which has modulatory effects on the nervous system. As well as forming the "signal cables" between sensory neurons and motoneurons, intermediate neurons in the nerve net can also form ganglia that act as local coordination centers. Communication between nerve cells can occur by chemical synapses or gap junctions in hydrozoans, though gap junctions are not present in all groups. Cnidarians have many of the same neurotransmitters as bilaterians, including chemicals such as glutamate, GABA, and glycine. Serotonin, dopamine, noradrenaline, octopamine, histamine, and acetylcholine, on the other hand, are absent.

This structure ensures that the musculature is excited rapidly and simultaneously, and can be directly stimulated from any point on the body, and it also is better able to recover after injury.

Medusae and complex swimming colonies such as siphonophores and chondrophores sense tilt and acceleration by means of statocysts, chambers lined with hairs which detect the movements of internal mineral grains called statoliths. If the body tilts in the wrong direction, the animal rights itself by increasing the strength of the swimming movements on the side that is too low. Most species have ocelli ("simple eyes"), which can detect sources of light. However, the agile box jellyfish are unique among Medusae because they possess four kinds of true eyes that have retinas, corneas and lenses. Although the eyes probably do not form images, Cubozoa can clearly distinguish the direction from which light is coming as well as negotiate around solid-colored objects.

=== Feeding and excretion ===
Cnidarians feed in several ways: predation, absorbing dissolved organic chemicals, filtering food particles out of the water, obtaining nutrients from symbiotic algae within their cells, and parasitism. Most obtain the majority of their food from predation but some, including the corals Hetroxenia and Leptogorgia, depend almost completely on their endosymbionts and on absorbing dissolved nutrients. Cnidaria give their symbiotic algae carbon dioxide, some nutrients, and protection against predators.

Predatory species use their cnidocytes to poison or entangle prey, and those with venomous nematocysts may start digestion by injecting digestive enzymes. The "smell" of fluids from wounded prey makes the tentacles fold inwards and wipe the prey off into the mouth. In medusae, the tentacles around the edge of the bell are often short and most of the prey capture is done by "oral arms", which are extensions of the edge of the mouth and are often frilled and sometimes branched to increase their surface area. These "oral arms" aid in cnidarians' ability to move prey towards their mouth once it has been poisoned and entangled. Medusae often trap prey or suspended food particles by swimming upwards, spreading their tentacles and oral arms and then sinking. In species for which suspended food particles are important, the tentacles and oral arms often have rows of cilia whose beating creates currents that flow towards the mouth, and some produce nets of mucus to trap particles. Their digestion is both intra and extracellular.

Once the food is in the digestive cavity, gland cells in the gastroderm release enzymes that reduce the prey to slurry, usually within a few hours. This circulates through the digestive cavity and, in colonial cnidarians, through the connecting tunnels, so that gastroderm cells can absorb the nutrients. Absorption may take a few hours, and digestion within the cells may take a few days. The circulation of nutrients is driven by water currents produced by cilia in the gastroderm or by muscular movements or both, so that nutrients reach all parts of the digestive cavity. Nutrients reach the outer cell layer by diffusion or, for animals or zooids such as medusae which have thick mesogleas, are transported by mobile cells in the mesoglea.

Indigestible remains of prey are expelled through the mouth. The main waste product of cells' internal processes is ammonia, which is removed by the external and internal water currents.

=== Respiration ===
There are no respiratory organs, and both cell layers absorb oxygen from and expel carbon dioxide into the surrounding water. When the water in the digestive cavity becomes stale it must be replaced, and nutrients that have not been absorbed will be expelled with it. Some Anthozoa have ciliated grooves on their tentacles, allowing them to pump water out of and into the digestive cavity without opening the mouth. This improves respiration after feeding and allows these animals, which use the cavity as a hydrostatic skeleton, to control the water pressure in the cavity without expelling undigested food.

Cnidaria that carry photosynthetic symbionts may have the opposite problem, an excess of oxygen, which may prove toxic. The animals produce large quantities of antioxidants to neutralize the excess oxygen.

=== Regeneration ===
All cnidarians can regenerate, allowing them to recover from injury and to reproduce asexually. Medusae have limited ability to regenerate, but polyps can do so from small pieces or even collections of separated cells. This enables corals to recover even after apparently being destroyed by predators.

== Reproduction ==
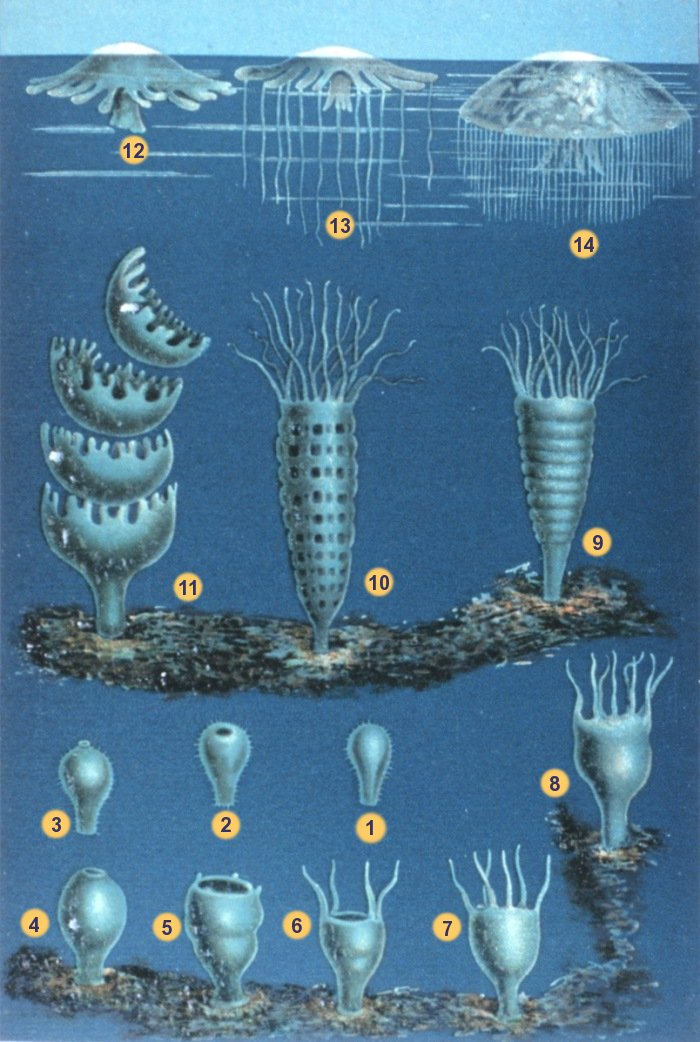
Life cycle of a jellyfish:
1–3 Larva searches for site
4–8 Polyp grows
9–11 Polyp strobilates
12–14 Medusa grows

=== Sexual ===
Cnidarian sexual reproduction often involves a complex life cycle with both polyp and medusa stages. For example, in Scyphozoa (jellyfish) and Cubozoa (box jellies), a larva swims until it finds a good site, and then becomes a polyp. This grows normally but then absorbs its tentacles and splits horizontally into a series of disks that become juvenile medusae, a process called strobilation. The juveniles swim off and slowly grow to maturity, while the polyp re-grows and may continue strobilating periodically. The adult medusae have gonads in the gastroderm, and these release ova and sperm into the water in the breeding season.

This phenomenon of succession of differently organized generations (one asexually reproducing, sessile polyp, followed by a free-swimming medusa or a sessile polyp that reproduces sexually) is sometimes called "alternation of asexual and sexual phases" or "metagenesis", but should not be confused with the alternation of generations as found in plants.

Shortened forms of this life cycle are common, for example some oceanic scyphozoans omit the polyp stage completely, and cubozoan polyps produce only one medusa. Hydrozoa have a variety of life cycles. Some have no polyp stages and some (e.g. hydra) have no medusae. In some species, the medusae remain attached to the polyp and are responsible for sexual reproduction; in extreme cases these reproductive zooids may not look much like medusae. Meanwhile, life cycle reversal, in which polyps are formed directly from medusae without the involvement of sexual reproduction process, was observed in both Hydrozoa (Turritopsis dohrnii and Laodicea undulata) and Scyphozoa (Aurelia sp.1). Anthozoa have no medusa stage at all and the polyps are responsible for sexual reproduction.

Spawning is generally driven by environmental factors such as changes in the water temperature, and their release is triggered by lighting conditions such as sunrise, sunset or the phase of the moon. Many species of Cnidaria may spawn simultaneously in the same location, so that there are too many ova and sperm for predators to eat more than a tiny percentage — one famous example is the Great Barrier Reef, where at least 110 corals and a few non-cnidarian invertebrates produce enough gametes to turn the water cloudy. These mass spawnings may produce hybrids, some of which can settle and form polyps, but it is not known how long these can survive. In some species the ova release chemicals that attract sperm of the same species.

The fertilized eggs develop into larvae by dividing until there are enough cells to form a hollow sphere (blastula) and then a depression forms at one end (gastrulation) and eventually becomes the digestive cavity. However, in cnidarians the depression forms at the end further from the yolk (at the animal pole), while in bilaterians it forms at the other end (vegetal pole). The larvae, called planulae, swim or crawl by means of cilia. They are cigar-shaped but slightly broader at the "front" end, which is the aboral, vegetal-pole end and eventually attaches to a substrate if the species has a polyp stage.

Anthozoan larvae either have large yolks or are capable of feeding on plankton, and some already have endosymbiotic algae that help to feed them. Since the parents are immobile, these feeding capabilities extend the larvae's range and avoid overcrowding of sites. Scyphozoan and hydrozoan larvae have little yolk and most lack endosymbiotic algae, and therefore have to settle quickly and metamorphose into polyps. Instead, these species rely on their medusae to extend their ranges.

=== Asexual ===
All known cnidarians can reproduce asexually by various means, in addition to regenerating after being fragmented. Hydrozoan polyps only bud, while the medusae of some hydrozoans can divide down the middle. Scyphozoan polyps can both bud and split down the middle. In addition to both of these methods, Anthozoa can split horizontally just above the base. Asexual reproduction makes the daughter cnidarian a clone of the adult. The ability of cnidarians to asexually reproduce ensures a greater number of mature medusa that can mature to reproduce sexually.

=== DNA repair ===
Two classical DNA repair pathways, nucleotide excision repair and base excision repair, are present in hydra, and these repair pathways facilitate unhindered reproduction. The identification of these pathways in hydra is based, in part, on the presence in the hydra genome of genes homologous to genes in other genetically well studied species that have been demonstrated to play key roles in these DNA repair pathways.

== Classification ==
Cnidarians were for a long time grouped with ctenophores in the phylum Coelenterata, but increasing awareness of their differences caused them to be placed in separate phyla. Modern cnidarians are generally classified into four main classes: sessile Anthozoa (sea anemones, corals, sea pens); swimming Scyphozoa (jellyfish) and Cubozoa (box jellies); and Hydrozoa, a diverse group that includes all the freshwater cnidarians as well as many marine forms, and has both sessile members such as Hydra and colonial swimmers such as the Portuguese Man o' War. Staurozoa have recently been recognised as a class in their own right rather than a sub-group of Scyphozoa, and the parasitic Myxozoa and Polypodiozoa are now recognized as highly derived cnidarians rather than more closely related to the bilaterians.

	Hydrozoa	Scyphozoa	Cubozoa	Anthozoa	Myxozoa
Number of species	3,600	228	42	6,100	1300
Examples	Hydra, siphonophores	Jellyfish	Box jellies	Sea anemones, corals, sea pens	Myxobolus cerebralis
Cells found in mesoglea	No	Yes	Yes	Yes	
Nematocysts in exodermis	No	Yes	Yes	Yes	
Medusa phase in life cycle	In some species	Yes	Yes	No	
Number of medusae produced per polyp	Many	Many	One	(not applicable)	

Stauromedusae, small sessile cnidarians with stalks and no medusa stage, have traditionally been classified as members of the Scyphozoa, but recent research suggests they should be regarded as a separate class, Staurozoa.

The Myxozoa, microscopic parasites, were first classified as protozoans. Research then found that Polypodium hydriforme, a non-myxozoan parasite within the egg cells of sturgeon, is closely related to the Myxozoa and suggested that both Polypodium and the Myxozoa were intermediate between cnidarians and bilaterian animals. More recent research demonstrates that the previous identification of bilaterian genes reflected contamination of the myxozoan samples by material from their host organism, and they are now firmly identified as heavily derived cnidarians, and more closely related to Hydrozoa and Scyphozoa than to Anthozoa.

Some researchers classify the extinct conulariids as cnidarians, while others propose that they form a completely separate phylum.

Current classification according to the World Register of Marine Species:

- subphylum Anthozoa Ehrenberg, 1834
  - class Hexacorallia Haeckel, 1896 — hexacorallians (anemones, tube anemones, corallimorphs, black corals, etc.)
  - class Octocorallia Haeckel, 1866 — octocorallians (various hard and soft corals, gorgonians, sea pens)
- subphylum Endocnidozoa Zrzavý & Hypša, 2003 — parasites
  - class Myxozoa Grassé, 1970
  - class Polypodiozoa Raikova, 1994
- subphylum Medusozoa Petersen, 1979
  - class Cubozoa Werner, 1973 — box jellyfish
  - class Hydrozoa Owen, 1843 — hydrozoans (fire corals, hydrae, chondrophores, siphonophores, etc.)
  - class Scyphozoa Goette, 1887 — true jellyfish
  - class Staurozoa Marques & Collins, 2004 — stalked jellyfish
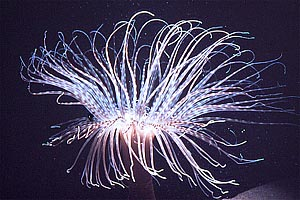
Cerianthus filiformis (Ceriantharia)

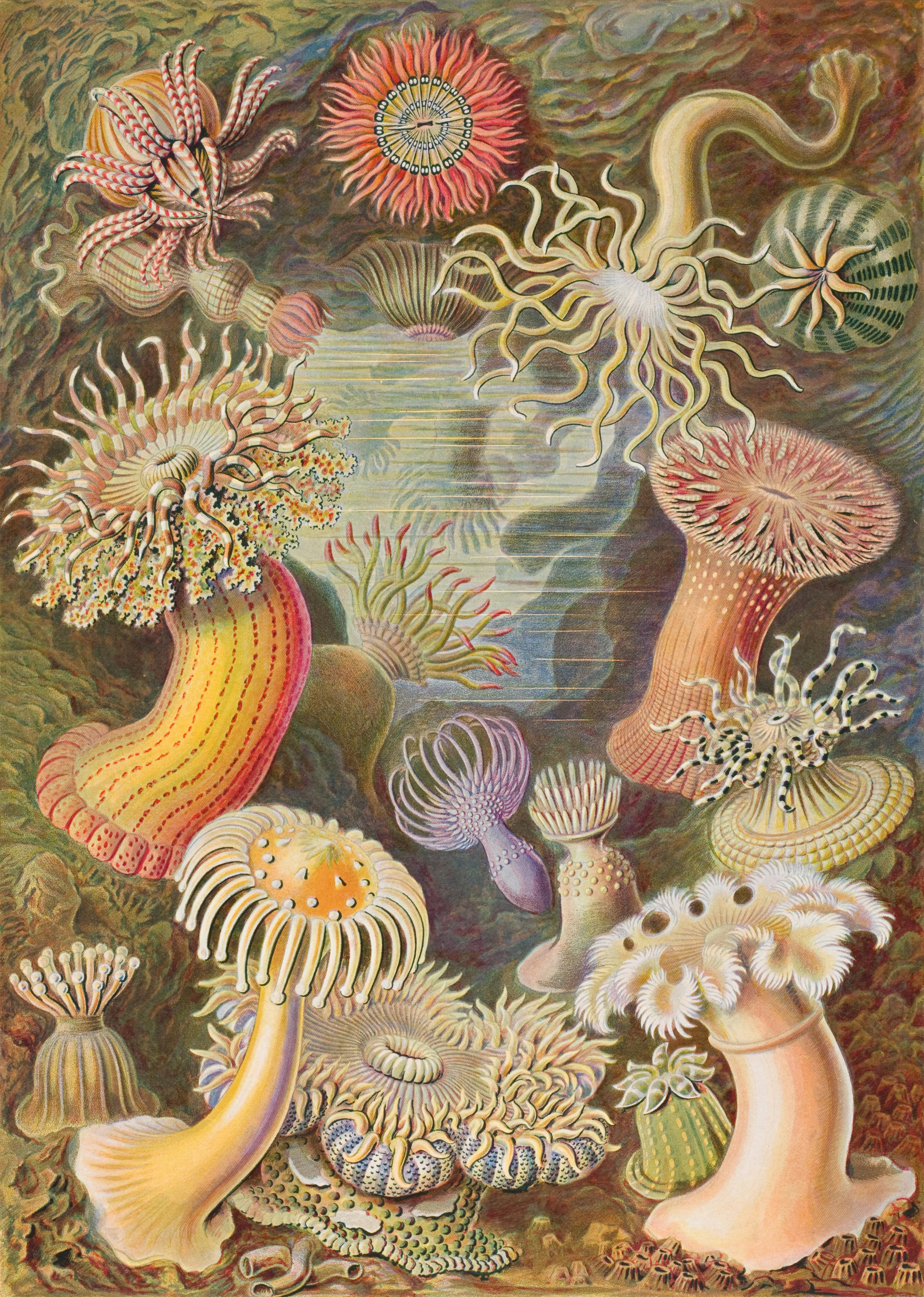
Sea anemones (Actiniaria, part of Hexacorallia)

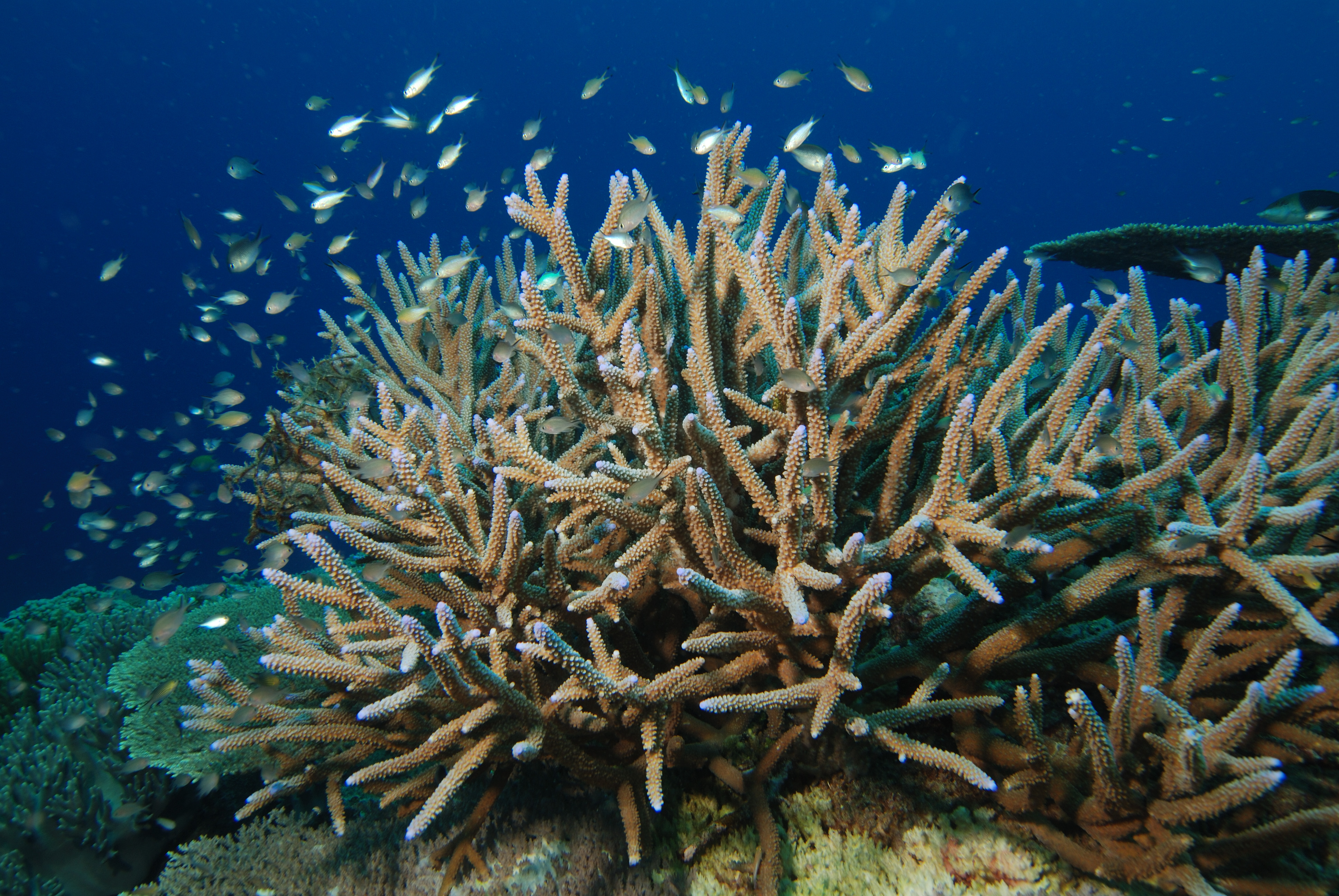
Coral Acropora muricata (Scleractinia, part of Hexacorallia)

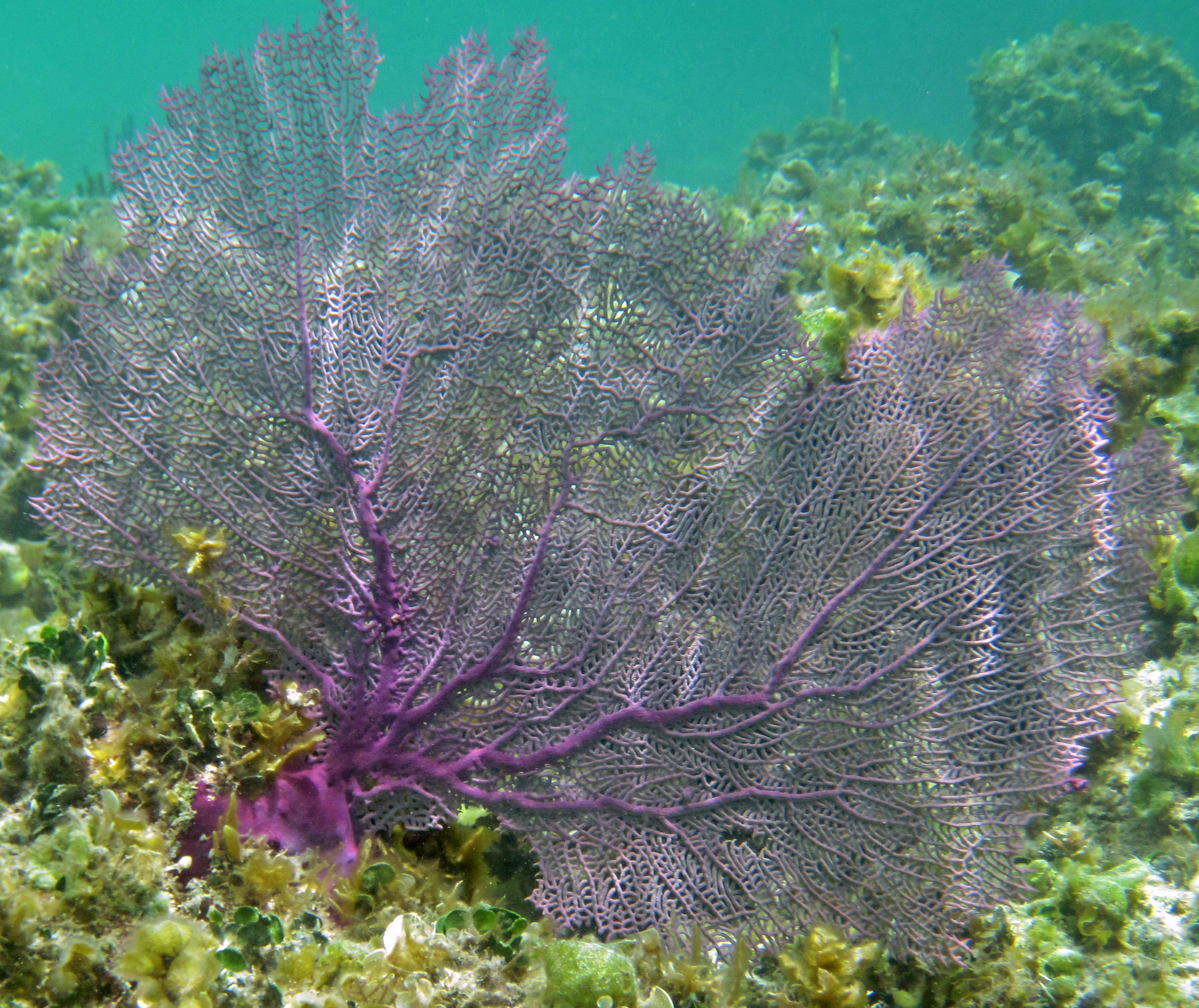
Sea fan Gorgonia ventalina (Octocorallia, part of Octocorallia)

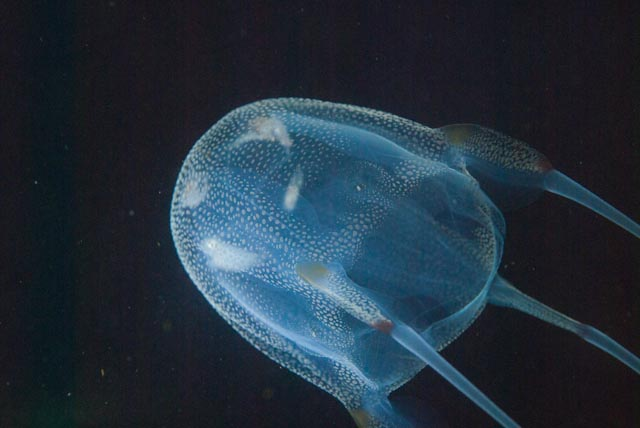
Box jellyfish Carybdea branchi (Cubozoa)

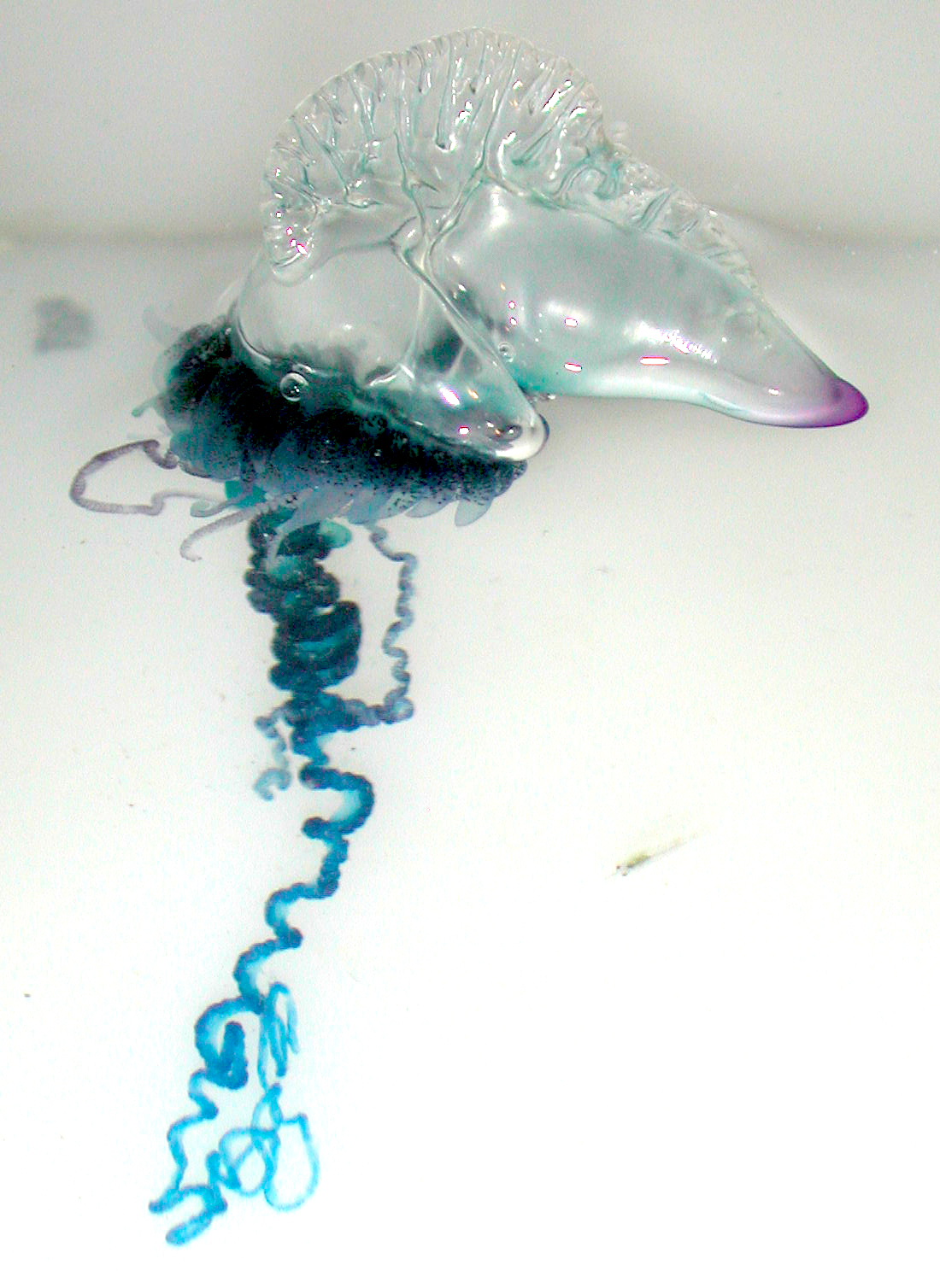
Siphonophore Physalia physalis (Hydrozoa)

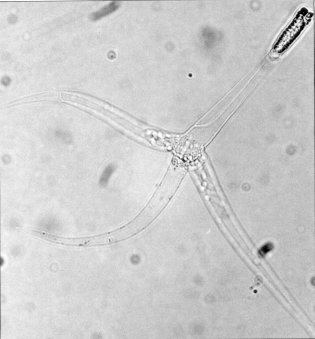
Myxobolus cerebralis (Myxozoa)

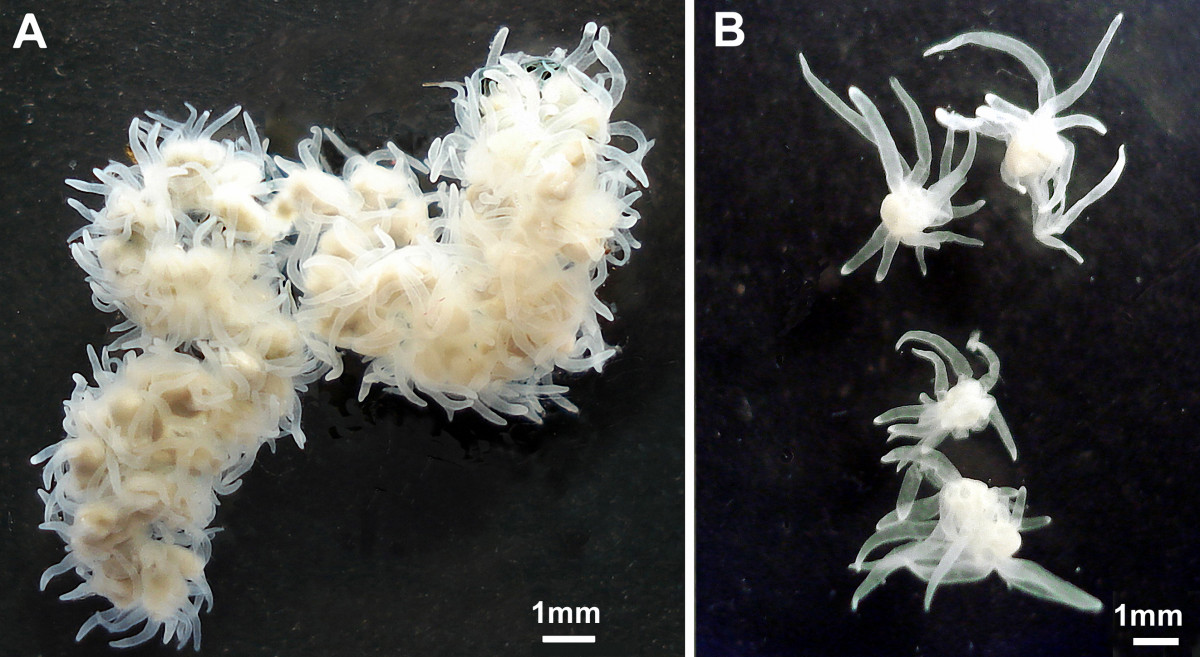
Polypodium hydriforme (Polypodiozoa)

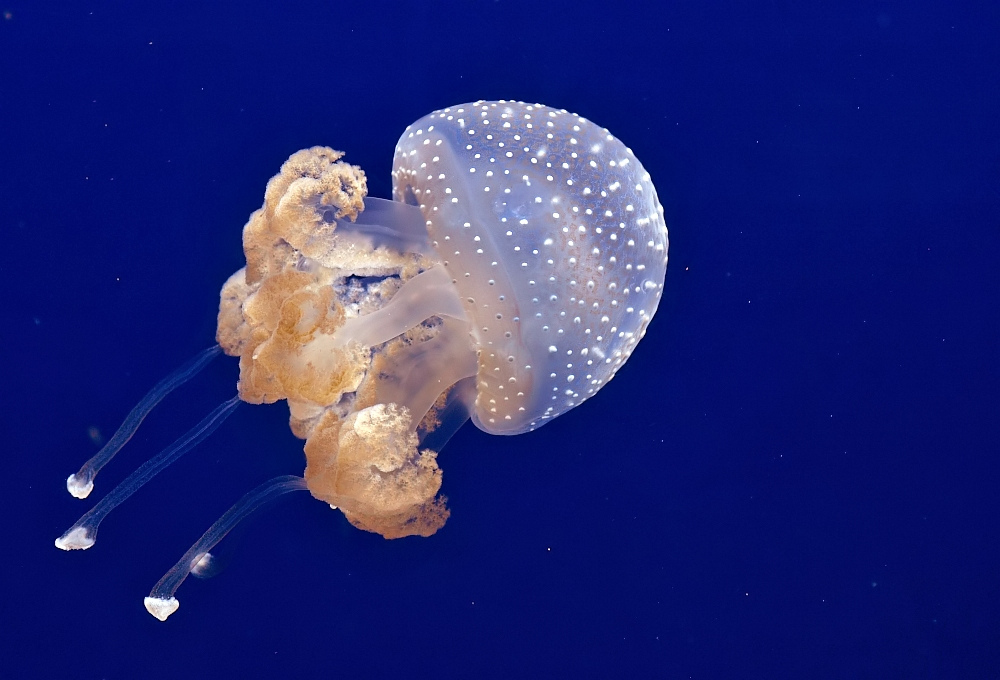
Jellyfish Phyllorhiza punctata (Scyphozoa)

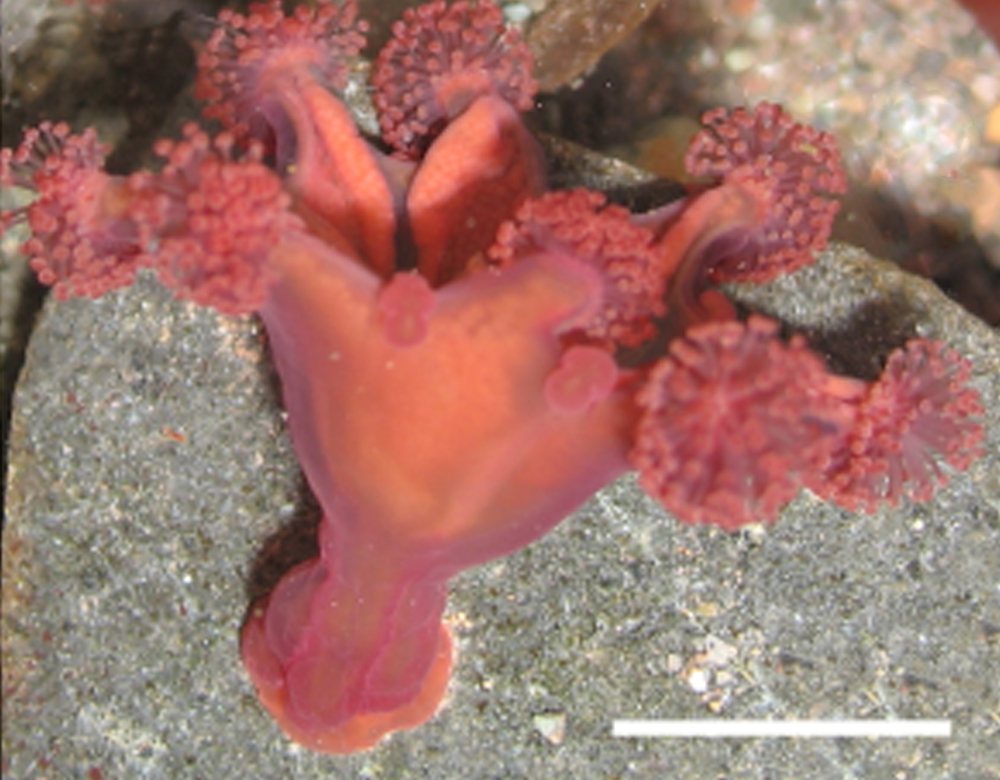
Stalked jelly Haliclystus antarcticus (Staurozoa)

== Ecology ==
Many cnidarians are limited to shallow waters because they depend on endosymbiotic algae for much of their nutrients. The life cycles of most have polyp stages, which are limited to locations that offer stable substrates. Nevertheless, major cnidarian groups contain species that have escaped these limitations. Hydrozoans have a worldwide range: some, such as Hydra, live in freshwater; Obelia appears in the coastal waters of all the oceans; and Liriope can form large shoals near the surface in mid-ocean. Among anthozoans, a few scleractinian corals, sea pens and sea fans live in deep, cold waters, and some sea anemones inhabit polar seabeds while others live near hydrothermal vents over 10 km (33,000 ft) below sea-level. Reef-building corals are limited to tropical seas between 30°N and 30°S with a maximum depth of 46 m (151 ft), temperatures between 20 and 28 °C (68 and 82 °F), high salinity, and low carbon dioxide levels. Stauromedusae, although usually classified as jellyfish, are stalked, sessile animals that live in cool to Arctic waters. Cnidarians range in size from a mere handful of cells for the parasitic myxozoans through Hydra's length of 5–20 mm (1/4–3/4 in), to the lion's mane jellyfish, which may exceed 2 m (6 ft 7 in) in diameter and 75 m (246 ft) in length.

Prey of cnidarians ranges from plankton to animals several times larger than themselves. Some cnidarians are parasites, mainly on jellyfish but a few are major pests of fish. Others obtain most of their nourishment from endosymbiotic algae or dissolved nutrients. Predators of cnidarians include: sea slugs, flatworms and comb jellies, which can incorporate nematocysts into their own bodies for self-defense (nematocysts used by cnidarian predators are referred to as kleptocnidae); starfish, notably the crown of thorns starfish, which can devastate corals; butterfly fish and parrot fish, which eat corals; and marine turtles, which eat jellyfish. Some sea anemones and jellyfish have a symbiotic relationship with some fish; for example clownfish live among the tentacles of sea anemones, and each partner protects the other against predators.

Coral reefs form some of the world's most productive ecosystems. Common coral reef cnidarians include both anthozoans (hard corals, octocorals, anemones) and hydrozoans (fire corals, lace corals). The endosymbiotic algae of many cnidarian species are very effective primary producers, in other words converters of inorganic chemicals into organic ones that other organisms can use, and their coral hosts use these organic chemicals very efficiently. In addition, reefs provide complex and varied habitats that support a wide range of other organisms. Fringing reefs just below low-tide level also have a mutually beneficial relationship with mangrove forests at high-tide level and seagrass meadows in between: the reefs protect the mangroves and seagrass from strong currents and waves that would damage them or erode the sediments in which they are rooted, while the mangroves and seagrass protect the coral from large influxes of silt, fresh water and pollutants. This additional level of variety in the environment is beneficial to many types of coral reef animals, which for example may feed in the sea grass and use the reefs for protection or breeding.

== Evolutionary history ==
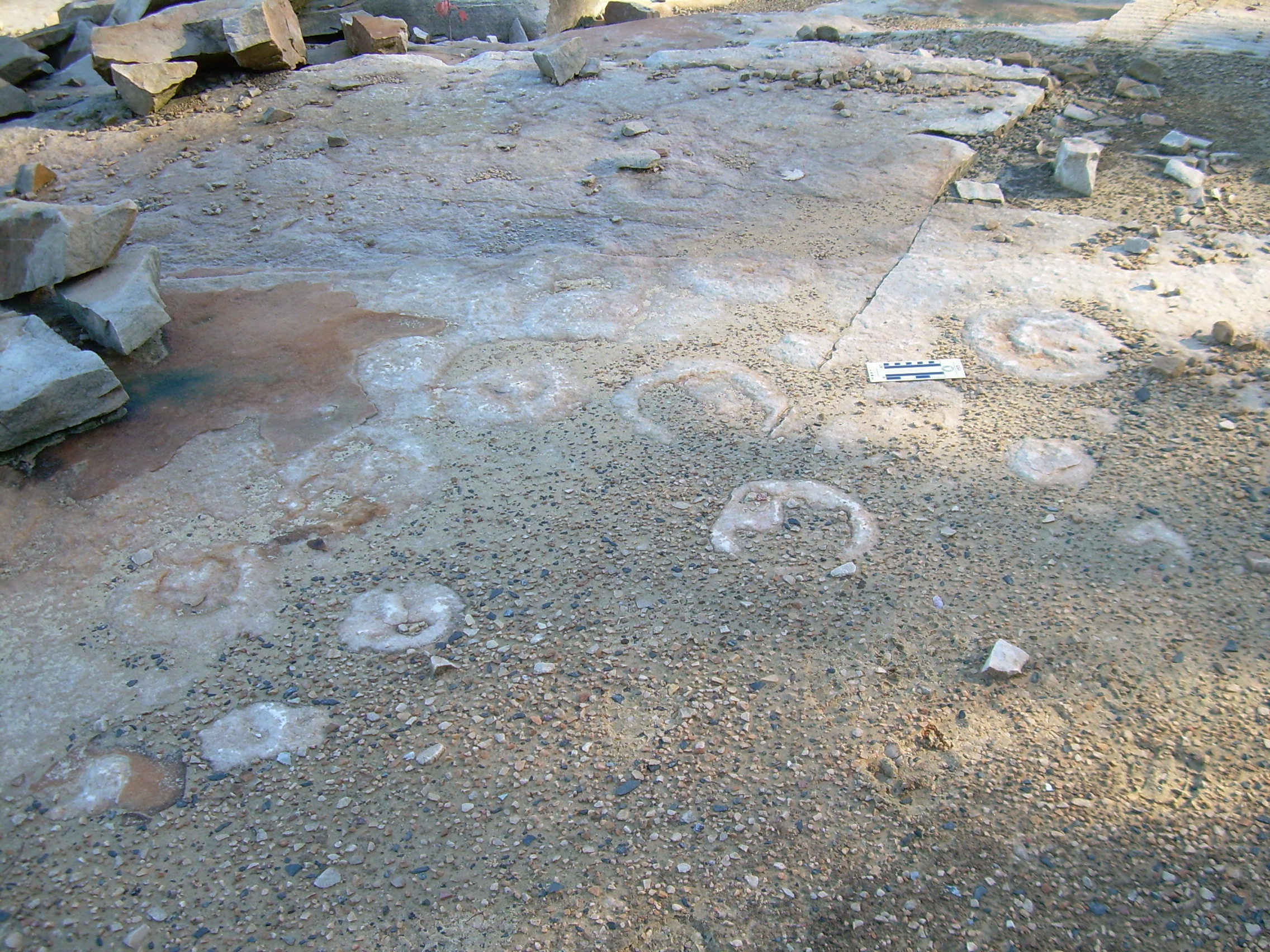
Stranded scyphozoans on a Cambrian tidal flat in Blackberry Hill, Wisconsin.

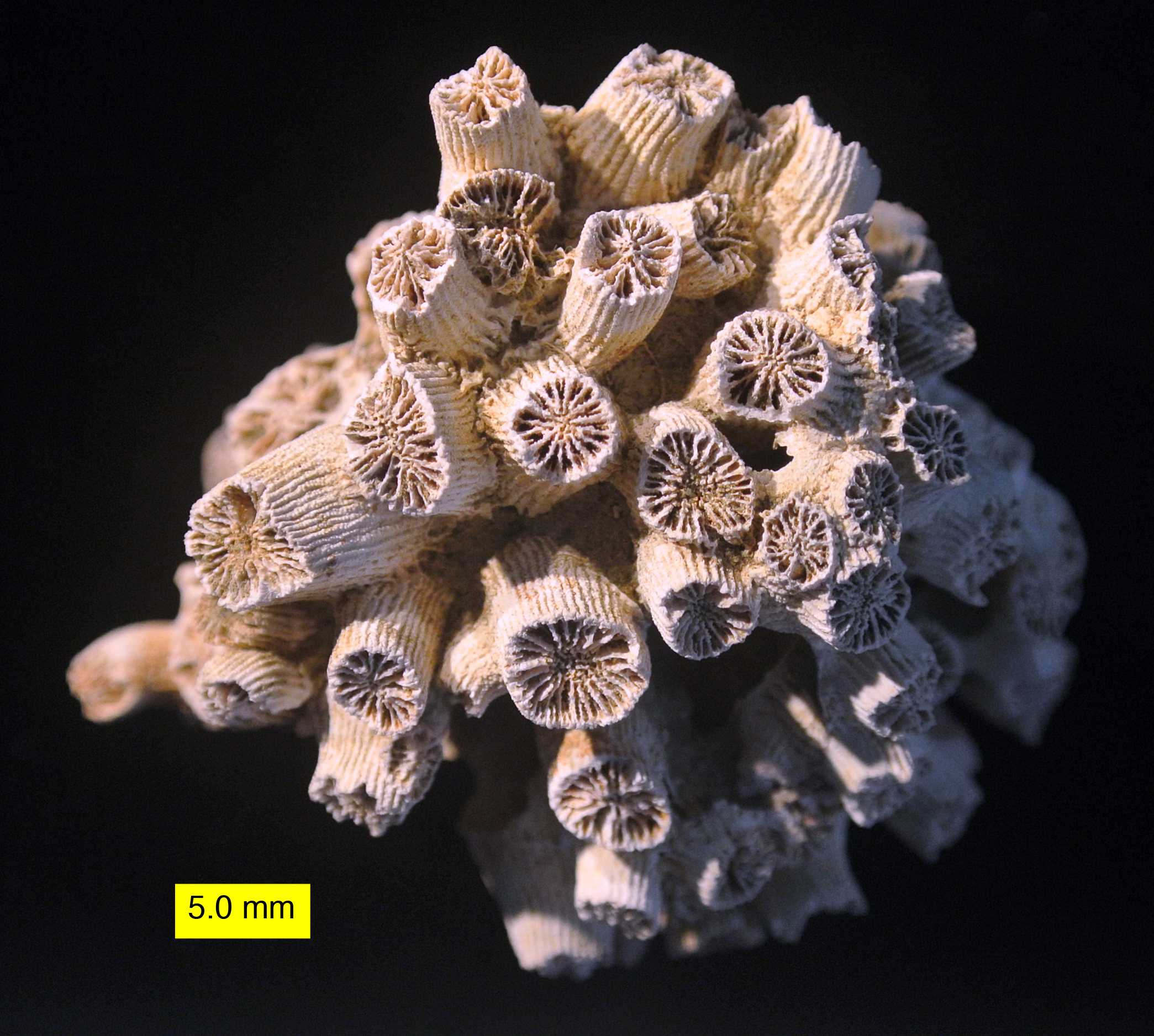
The fossil coral Cladocora from Pliocene rocks in Cyprus

=== Fossil record ===
The earliest widely accepted animal fossils are rather modern-looking cnidarians, possibly from around 580 million years ago, although fossils from the Doushantuo Formation can only be dated approximately. The identification of some of these as embryos of animals has been contested, but other fossils from these rocks strongly resemble tubes and other mineralized structures made by corals. Their presence implies that the cnidarian and bilaterian lineages had already diverged. Although the Ediacaran fossil Charnia used to be classified as a jellyfish or sea pen, more recent study of growth patterns in Charnia and modern cnidarians has cast doubt on this hypothesis, leaving the Canadian polyp Haootia and the British Auroralumina as the only recognized cnidarian body fossils from the Ediacaran. Auroralumina is the earliest known animal predator. Few fossils of cnidarians without mineralized skeletons are known from more recent rocks, except in Lagerstätten that preserved soft-bodied animals.

A few mineralized fossils that resemble corals have been found in rocks from the Cambrian period, and corals diversified in the Early Ordovician. These corals, which were wiped out in the Permian–Triassic extinction event about 252 million years ago, did not dominate reef construction since sponges and algae also played a major part. During the Mesozoic era, rudist bivalves were the main reef-builders, but they were wiped out in the Cretaceous–Paleogene extinction event 66 million years ago, and since then the main reef-builders have been scleractinian corals.

Most fossils of cnidarians have been found in marine paleoenvironments, which is consistent with the marine habitat of most extant cnidarian species. In the Carboniferous and Permian, some cnidarian fossils have been reported in non-marine (continental environments). These have typically been interpreted as freshwater paleoenvironments, but this is uncertain given that brackish (even hypersaline) continental water bodies exist (even outside deserts) and harbor moderate biodiversity, that continental habitat is inferred when typical marine markers are absent, and negative evidence is inherently weak, all of which led to controversies about many of these supposedly freshwater deposits. Indeed, some continental Paleozoic cnidarians are thought to have inhabited salt lakes. A study even argued that fossil medusoids (some of which have been interpreted as freshwater by other studies) are "restricted lagoonal facies where anoxia and hypersalinity fostered preservation", and another one reinterpreted fossils of Essexella that had initially been interpreted as freshwater medusae from Mazon Creek as euryhaline semi-infaunal anemone.

Hydroconozoa is an extinct class of cnidarians, established by K.B. Korde in 1964 based on Lower Cambrian fossils from Tuva, USSR. These conical and cylindrical organisms, including genera like Hydroconus and Tuvaeconus, possessed external skeletons with features resembling both scyphozoans and tetracorals. Their unique skeletal structures suggest a distinct lineage within early cnidarian evolution.

A study in 2025 proposed that Agmatans belong to the cnidarian group rather than constituting their own separate phylum.

=== Phylogeny ===
It is difficult to reconstruct the early stages in the evolutionary "family tree" of animals using only morphology (their shapes and structures) because of the large differences between the major groups of animals. Hence, reconstructions now rely almost entirely on molecular phylogenetics, which groups organisms based on their biochemistry, most commonly by analyzing DNA or RNA sequences.

In 1866, it was proposed that Cnidaria and Ctenophora were more closely related to each other than to Bilateria and formed a group called Coelenterata ("hollow guts") because both rely on the flow of water in and out of a single cavity for feeding, excretion and respiration. In 1881, it was proposed that Ctenophora and Bilateria were more closely related to each other, since they shared features that Cnidaria lack, such as a middle layer of cells (mesoglea in Ctenophora, mesoderm in Bilateria) between the outer and inner layer found in other animals. However, more recent analyses indicate that these similarities were evolved independently in both lineages, instead of being present in their common ancestor. The current view is that Cnidaria and Bilateria are more closely related to each other than either is to Ctenophora. This grouping of Cnidaria and Bilateria has been labelled "Planulozoa", (Note: This group also probably contains Placozoa) named so because the earliest Bilateria were probably similar to the planula larvae of Cnidaria.

In 2005, Katja Seipel and Volker Schmid suggested that cnidarians and ctenophores are simplified descendants of triploblastic animals, since ctenophores and the medusa stage of some cnidarians have striated muscle, which in bilaterians arises from the mesoderm. They did not commit themselves on whether bilaterians evolved from early cnidarians or from the hypothesized triploblastic ancestors of cnidarians.

Resolving the evolutionary relationships within Cnidaria has also been challenging, with almost every possible combination of clades being proposed. As time went on though, a semi-consensus has started to emerge. The enigmatic Polypodium hydriforme and subphylum Myxozoa have been firmly placed within the Cnidaria and have been shown to be closely related to the Medusozoa. In addition, these two groups have been found to likely be each other's closest relatives which, if true, would form the clade "Endocnidozoa". The relationships within the Medusozoa are currently probably the most contentious part of the tree. Traditionally, the class Scyphozoa also included Staurozoa and Cubozoa, but significant morphological differences eventually lead to the split of the three. The group containing them has since been named "Acraspeda". The relationships between these three and Hydrozoa have since and still are debated. A relationship between Scyphozoa and Cubozoa with Staurozoa as its sister has seen support in nearly all studies, but the position of the remaining class, Hydrozoa, is not understood. Several studies have found that Acraspeda is paraphyletic, with Hydrozoa being more closely related to Scyphozoa than to the other classes. At the same time, other studies have recovered Acraspeda as being monophyletic. The subphylum Anthozoa is argued to have either two or three classes, but the relationships between them is not disputed; the tube-dwelling anemones of the class Ceriantharia have consistently shown to be more closely related to the Hexacorallia than to the Octocorallia.

- Cnidaria
  - Anthozoa
    - - Ceriantharia
      - Hexacorallia
    - Octocorallia
  - - Endocnidozoa
      - Myxozoa
        - Malacosporea
        - Myxosporea
      - Polypodiozoa
    - Medusozoa
      - Hydrozoa
      - Staurozoa
      - - Cubozoa
        - Scyphozoa

In molecular phylogenetics analyses from 2005 onwards, important groups of developmental genes show the same variety in cnidarians as in chordates. In fact cnidarians, and especially anthozoans (sea anemones and corals), retain some genes that are present in bacteria, protists, plants and fungi but not in bilaterians.

== Interaction with humans ==
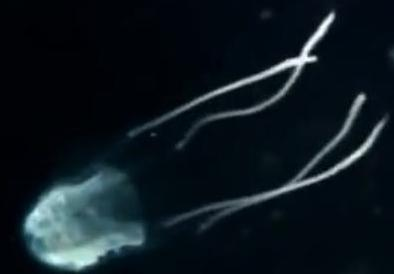
The dangerous Carukia barnesi, one of the known species of box jellyfish which can cause Irukandji syndrome.

Jellyfish stings killed about 1,500 people in the 20th century, and cubozoans are particularly dangerous. On the other hand, some large jellyfish are considered a delicacy in East and Southeast Asia. Coral reefs have long been economically important as providers of fishing grounds, protectors of shore buildings against currents and tides, and more recently as centers of tourism. However, they are vulnerable to over-fishing, mining for construction materials, pollution, and damage caused by tourism.

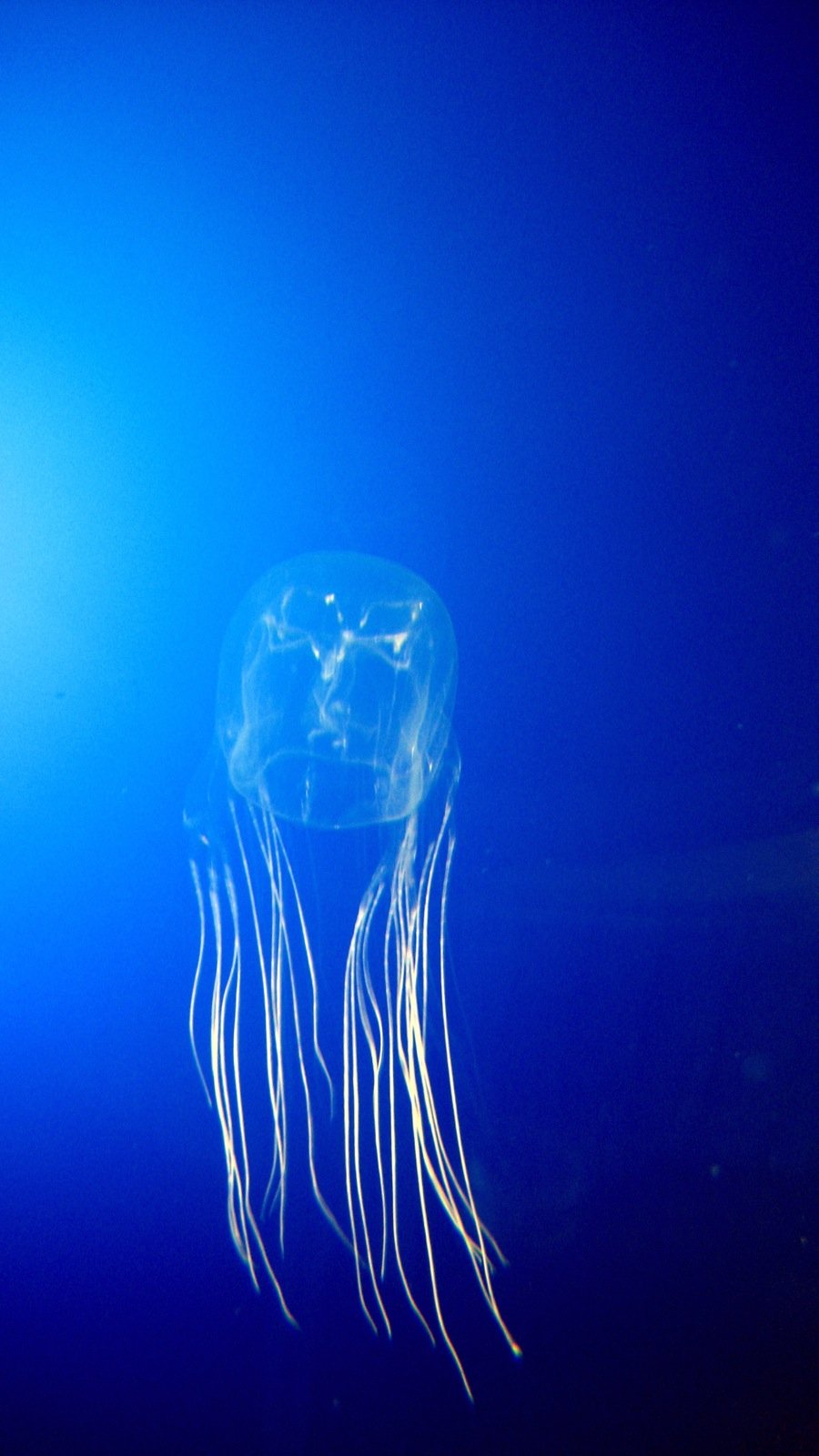
The dangerous "sea wasp" Chironex fleckeri

Beaches protected from tides and storms by coral reefs are often the best places for housing in tropical countries. Reefs are an important food source for low-technology fishing, both on the reefs themselves and in the adjacent seas. However, despite their great productivity, reefs are vulnerable to over-fishing, because much of the organic carbon they produce is exhaled as carbon dioxide by organisms at the middle levels of the food chain and never reaches the larger species that are of interest to fishermen. Tourism centered on reefs provides much of the income of some tropical islands, attracting photographers, divers and sports fishermen. However, human activities damage reefs in several ways: mining for construction materials; pollution, including large influxes of fresh water from storm drains; commercial fishing, including the use of dynamite to stun fish and the capture of young fish for aquariums; and tourist damage caused by boat anchors and the cumulative effect of walking on the reefs. Coral, mainly from the Pacific Ocean has long been used in jewellery, and demand rose sharply in the 1980s.

Some large jellyfish species of the Rhizostomeae order are commonly consumed in Japan, Korea and Southeast Asia. In parts of the range, fishing industry is restricted to daylight hours and calm conditions in two short seasons, from March to May and August to November. The commercial value of jellyfish food products depends on the skill with which they are prepared, and "Jellyfish Masters" guard their trade secrets carefully. Jellyfish is very low in cholesterol and sugars, but cheap preparation can introduce undesirable amounts of heavy metals.

The "sea wasp" Chironex fleckeri has been described as the world's most venomous jellyfish and is held responsible for 67 deaths, although it is difficult to identify the animal as it is almost transparent. Most stingings by C. fleckeri cause only mild symptoms. Seven other box jellies can cause a set of symptoms called Irukandji syndrome, which takes about 30 minutes to develop, and from a few hours to two weeks to disappear. Hospital treatment is usually required, and there have been a few deaths.

A number of the parasitic myxozoans are commercially important pathogens in salmonid aquaculture. A Scyphozoa species – Pelagia noctiluca – and a Hydrozoa – Muggiaea atlantica – have caused repeated mass mortality in salmon farms over the years around Ireland. A loss valued at £1 million struck in November 2007, 20,000 died off Clare Island in 2013 and four fish farms collectively lost tens of thousands of salmon in September 2017.
