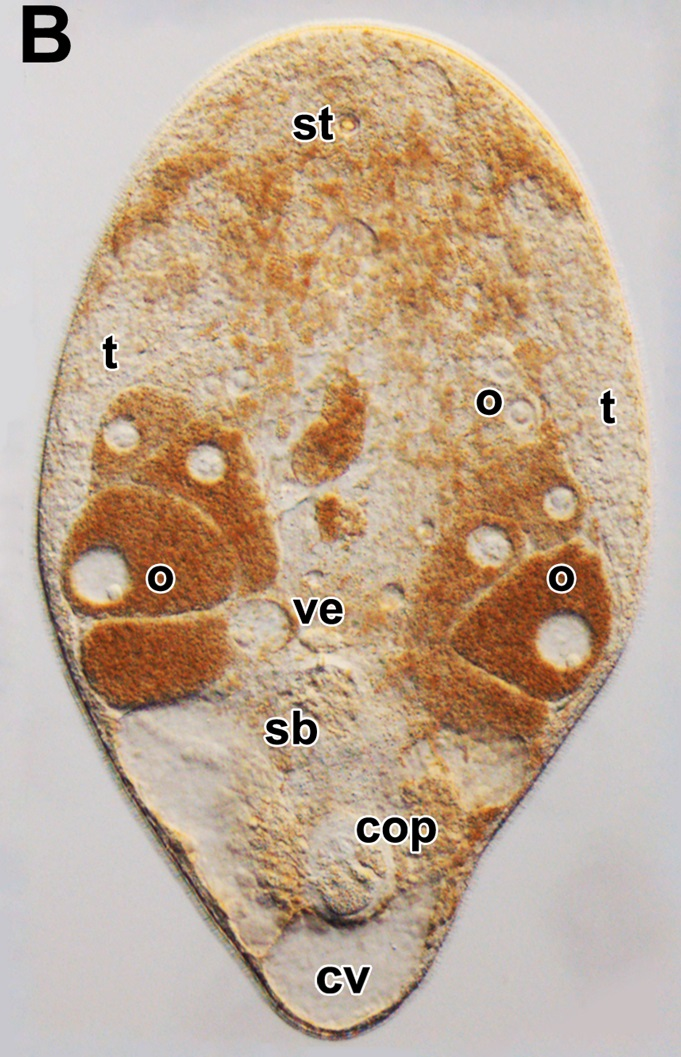

Scientific classification
- Kingdom: Animalia
- Phylum: Xenacoelomorpha
- Order: Acoela
- Family: Isodiametridae
- Genus: Aphanostoma
- Species: A. pulchra

Binomial name
- Aphanostoma pulchra (Smith & Bush, 1991)

Synonyms
- Isodiametra pulchra (Smith & Bush, 1991); Convoluta pulchra Smith & Bush, 1991

= Aphanostoma pulchra =

Species of marine worms

Aphanostoma pulchra is a species of marine worms in the family Isodiametridae, within the phylum Xenacoelomorpha. It was first described by Smith and Bush in 1991. It was transferred to Aphanostoma by Sarah Atherton and Ulf Jondeliu. The sexual organs of A. pulchra have been studied.
