= Diatomovora =

Scientific classification
- Kingdom: Animalia
- Phylum: Xenacoelomorpha
- Order: Acoela
- Family: Actinoposthiidae
- Genus: Diatomovora; Kozloff, 1965

Genus of flatworm-like animals

Diatomovora is a genus of worms belonging to the family Isodiametridae.

The species of this genus are found in Central America.

Species:

- Diatomovora amoena Kozloff, 1965
- Diatomovora jacki Hooge & Tyler, 2008
