= Exocelis =

Scientific classification
- Domain: Eukaryota
- Kingdom: Animalia
- Phylum: Xenacoelomorpha
- Order: Acoela
- Family: Haploposthiidae
- Genus: Exocelis; Ehlers & Dörjes, 1979

Genus of acoels

Exocelis is a genus of acoels belonging to the family Otocelididae.

The species of this genus are found in Central America.

Species:

- Exocelis exopenis Ehlers & Dörjes, 1979
- Exocelis reedi Hooge & Tyler, 2008
