= Ancylocirrus =

Scientific classification
- Kingdom: Animalia
- Phylum: Xenacoelomorpha
- Order: Acoela
- Family: Actinoposthiidae
- Genus: Ancylocirrus; Kozloff, 2000

Genus of acoels

Ancylocirrus is a genus of acoels belonging to the family Isodiametridae.

Species:

- Ancylocirrus ornatus Kozloff, 2000
