= Archaphanostoma =

Scientific classification
- Kingdom: Animalia
- Phylum: Xenacoelomorpha
- Order: Acoela
- Family: Actinoposthiidae
- Genus: Archaphanostoma; Dörjes, 1968

Genus of acoels

Archaphanostoma is a genus of acoels belonging to the family Isodiametridae.

The species of this genus are found in Northern Europe.

== Species ==
Species:

- Archaphanostoma agile (Jensen, 1878)
- Archaphanostoma fontaneti Kånneby, Bernvi & Jondelius, 2015
- Archaphanostoma histobursalis Dörjes, 1968
