= AlphaTauri =

AlphaTauri or variant, may refer to:

- AlphaTauri (fashion brand), fashion brand
- Scuderia AlphaTauri, Formula One team between 2020 and 2023; formerly Scuderia Toro Rosso, now Racing Bulls

== See also ==
- Aldebaran, also known as Alpha Tauri (α Tau)
- A Tauri
- Alpha (disambiguation)
- Tauri (disambiguation)
