= Haplocelis =

Scientific classification
- Kingdom: Animalia
- Phylum: Xenacoelomorpha
- Order: Acoela
- Family: Actinoposthiidae
- Genus: Haplocelis; Dörjes, 1968

Genus of flatworm-like animals

Haplocelis is a genus of worms belonging to the family Isodiametridae.

The species of this genus are found in Western America.

Species:

- Haplocelis dichona (Marcus, 1954)
