= Bursosaphia =

Scientific classification
- Kingdom: Animalia
- Phylum: Xenacoelomorpha
- Order: Acoela
- Family: Actinoposthiidae
- Genus: Bursosaphia; Dörjes, 1968

Genus of acoels

Bursosaphia is a genus of acoels belonging to the family Isodiametridae.

Species:

- Bursosaphia baltalimaniaformis Dörjes, 1968
