= Baltalimania =

Scientific classification
- Kingdom: Animalia
- Phylum: Xenacoelomorpha
- Order: Acoela
- Family: Actinoposthiidae
- Genus: Baltalimania; Ax, 1959

Genus of flatworm-like animals

Baltalimania is a genus of worms belonging to the family Isodiametridae.

Species:

- Baltalimania kosswigi Ax, 1959
