= Childianea =

Scientific classification
- Domain: Eukaryota
- Kingdom: Animalia
- Phylum: Xenacoelomorpha
- Order: Acoela
- Family: Actinoposthiidae
- Genus: Childianea; Faubel & Cameron, 2001

Genus of acoels

Childianea is a genus of acoels belonging to the family Actinoposthiidae.

The species of this genus are found in Australia.

Species:

- Childianea coomerensis Faubel & Cameron, 2001
