= Endocincta =

Scientific classification
- Domain: Eukaryota
- Kingdom: Animalia
- Phylum: Xenacoelomorpha
- Order: Acoela
- Family: Solenofilomorphidae
- Genus: Endocincta; Crezee, 1975

Genus of acoels

Endocincta is a genus of acoels belonging to the family Solenofilomorphidae.

Species:

- Endocincta punctata Crezee, 1975
