= Taurus Two =

Taurus Two, Taurus 2, Taurus II, or variation, may refer to:

- "Taurus 2" (song), a 1982 song by Mike Oldfield off the album Five Miles Out
- Moog Taurus II, a music synthesizer
- Bristol Taurus II, a radial aircraft engine
- Ford Taurus generation two, a passenger sedan car
- Taurus II rocket, a rocket in the Taurus series, later renamed to the Antares rocket

== See also ==
- Taurus (disambiguation)
