= Kuma (worm) =

Scientific classification
- Kingdom: Animalia
- Phylum: Xenacoelomorpha
- Order: Acoela
- Family: Haploposthiidae
- Genus: Kuma; Marcus, 1950

Genus of acoels

Kuma is a genus of acoels belonging to the family Proporidae.

The species of this genus are found in Europe and America.

Species:

- Kuma albiventer (Marcus, 1954)
- Kuma asilhas Hooge & Rocha, 2006
- Kuma belca Marcus, 1952
- Kuma blacki Hooge & Tyler, 2008
- Kuma brevicauda Marcus, 1950
- Kuma flava Hooge & Smith, 2004
- Kuma monogonophora (Westblad, 1946)
- Kuma viridis (An der Lan, 1936)
