= Haplotestis =

Scientific classification
- Domain: Eukaryota
- Kingdom: Animalia
- Phylum: Xenacoelomorpha
- Order: Acoela
- Family: Otocelididae
- Genus: Haplotestis; Dörjes, 1968

Genus of acoels

Haplotestis is a genus of acoels belonging to the family Otocelididae.

Species:

- Haplotestis curvitubus Dörjes, 1968
