= Polycanthus =

Scientific classification
- Domain: Eukaryota
- Kingdom: Animalia
- Phylum: Xenacoelomorpha
- Order: Acoela
- Family: Proporidae
- Genus: Polycanthus; Hooge, 2003
- Species: P. torosus

Binomial name
- Polycanthus torosus Hooge, 2003

Genus of acoels

Polycanthus is a genus of acoels. It is monospecific, being represented by a single species, Polycanthus torosus. It lives in a subtidal, sandy bottom habitat in the western South Pacific Ocean.
