= Taurus One =

Taurus One, Taurus 1, Taurus I, or variation, may refer to:

- "Taurus 1" (song), a 1980 song by Mike Oldfield off the album QE2 (album)
- Moog Taurus I, a music synthesizer
- Bristol Taurus I, a radial aircraft engine
- Ford Taurus generation one, a passenger sedan car
- Taurus 1 rocket, the first Taurus series rocket, later renamed to Minotaur-C

== See also ==
- Taurus (disambiguation)
