= Hofsteniola =

Scientific classification
- Domain: Eukaryota
- Kingdom: Animalia
- Phylum: Xenacoelomorpha
- Order: Acoela
- Family: Hofsteniidae
- Genus: Hofsteniola; Papi, 1957

Genus of acoels

Hofsteniola is a genus of acoels belonging to the family Hofsteniidae.

Species:

- Hofsteniola pardii Papi, 1957
