= Childia =

Scientific classification
- Kingdom: Animalia
- Phylum: Xenacoelomorpha
- Order: Acoela
- Family: Mecynostomidae
- Genus: Childia

Species
- See text.

Genus of acoels

Childia is a genus of acoels in the family Mecynostomidae.

== Species ==
Contains the following species:

- Childia aculifera Nilsson, Wallberg & Jondelius, 2011
- Childia brachyposthium (Westblad, 1942)
- Childia crassum (Westblad, 1942)
- Childia curinii Nilsson, Wallberg & Jondelius, 2011
- Childia cycloposthium (Westblad, 1942)
- Childia dubium (Westblad, 1942)
- Childia etium (Marcus, 1954)
- Childia gracilis (Westblad, 1945)
- Childia groenlandica (Levinsen, 1879)
- Childia leptoposthium (Riedl, 1956)
- Childia macroposthium (Steinböck, 1931)
- Childia submaculatum (Westblad, 1942)
- Childia trianguliferum (Westblad, 1942)
- Childia vivipara Tekle, Raikova & Jondelius, 2006
- Childia westbladi (Marcus, 1950)
