= Proporus carolinensis =

Scientific classification
- Kingdom: Animalia
- Phylum: Xenacoelomorpha
- Order: Acoela
- Family: Proporidae
- Genus: Proporus
- Species: P. carolinensis

Binomial name
- Proporus carolinensis Hooge & Smith, 2004

Species of worm-like animal

Proporus carolinensis is a species of acoel in the family Proporidae. It grows to a maximum length of 0.1 cm (or 1 mm). It lives in the western-central Atlantic (in areas near Belize and North Carolina), in sea sand, inlet areas, and subtidal areas.
