= Marcusiola =

Scientific classification
- Domain: Eukaryota
- Kingdom: Animalia
- Phylum: Xenacoelomorpha
- Order: Acoela
- Family: Hofsteniidae
- Genus: Marcusiola; Steinböck, 1966

Genus of acoels

Marcusiola is a genus of acoels belonging to the family Hofsteniidae.

Species:

- Marcusiola tinga (Du Bois-Reymond Marcus, 1957)
