= Tauri (disambiguation) =

The Tauri were a people settled on the Crimea peninsula during the 1st millennium BC.

Tauri may also refer to

- The genitive form of taurus, e.g. in designations for stars in the constellation Taurus
- Forum Tauri, later Forum of Theodosius, an area in ancient Constantinople
- Ostreococcus tauri, a unicellular species of marine green alga
- Tau'ri, a name for the human race in the Stargate franchise
- Tauri (software framework), desktop/web application framework using web technologies and Rust
- A man's name in Estonia

== See also ==
- Tauris (disambiguation)
- Taurus (disambiguation)
