= Hallangia =

Scientific classification
- Domain: Eukaryota
- Kingdom: Animalia
- Phylum: Xenacoelomorpha
- Order: Acoela
- Family: Hallangiidae
- Genus: Hallangia; Westblad, 1946

Genus of acoels

Hallangia is a genus of acoels belonging to the family Hallangiidae.

The species of this genus are found in Northern Europe.

Species:

- Hallangia proporoides Westblad, 1946
