= Alluna =

Scientific classification
- Domain: Eukaryota
- Kingdom: Animalia
- Phylum: Xenacoelomorpha
- Order: Acoela
- Family: Isodiametridae
- Genus: Alluna; Faubel & Regier, 1983

Genus of acoels

Alluna is a genus of acoels belonging to the family Actinoposthiidae.

The species of this genus are found in Great Britain.

Species:

- Alluna sublitoralis Faubel & Regier, 1983
