= Taurus Three =

Taurus Three, Taurus 3, Taurus III, or variation, may refer to:

- "Taurus 3" (song), a 1983 song by Mike Oldenfield off the album Crises (album)
- Moog Taurus III, a music synthesizer
- Bristol Taurus III, a radial aircraft engine
- Ford Taurus generation three, a passenger sedan car

== See also ==
- Taurus (disambiguation)
