= Antroposthia =

Scientific classification
- Domain: Eukaryota
- Kingdom: Animalia
- Phylum: Xenacoelomorpha
- Order: Acoela
- Family: Antroposthiidae
- Genus: Antroposthia; Faubel, 1974

Genus of acoels

Antroposthia is a genus of acoels belonging to the family Antroposthiidae.

Species:

- Antroposthia axi Faubel, 1974
- Antroposthia unipora Faubel, 1974
