= Deuterogonaria =

Scientific classification
- Domain: Eukaryota
- Kingdom: Animalia
- Phylum: Xenacoelomorpha
- Order: Acoela
- Family: Haploposthiidae
- Genus: Deuterogonaria; Dörjes, 1968

Genus of acoels

Deuterogonaria is a genus of acoels belonging to the family Proporidae.

The species of this genus are found in America.

Species:

- Deuterogonaria carribea (Achatz, Hooge & Tyler, 2007)
- Deuterogonaria renei (Achatz & Hooge, 2006)
- Deuterogonaria thauma (Marcus, 1952)
