= Aechmalotus =

Scientific classification
- Domain: Eukaryota
- Kingdom: Animalia
- Phylum: Xenacoelomorpha
- Order: Acoela
- Family: Hallangiidae
- Genus: Aechmalotus; Beklemischev, 1915

Genus of acoels

Aechmalotus is a genus of acoels belonging to the family Hallangiidae.

The species of this genus are found in Northern Europe.

Species:

- Aechmalotus pyrula Beklemischev, 1915
