= Microposthia =

Scientific classification
- Kingdom: Animalia
- Phylum: Xenacoelomorpha
- Order: Acoela
- Family: Actinoposthiidae
- Genus: Microposthia; Faubel, 1974

Genus of acoels

Microposthia is a genus of acoels belonging to the family Actinoposthiidae.

Species:

- Microposthia listensis Faubel, 1974
