= Mecynostomum =

Scientific classification
- Kingdom: Animalia
- Phylum: Xenacoelomorpha
- Order: Acoela
- Family: Mecynostomidae
- Genus: Mecynostomum; Beneden, 1870

Genus of acoels

Mecynostomum is a genus of acoels belonging to the family Mecynostomidae.

The species of this genus are found in Europe and Central America.

== Species ==
Species:

- Mecynostomum auritum (Schultze, 1851)
- Mecynostomum caudatum (Uljanin, 1870)
- Mecynostomum cordiforme Levinsen, 1879
