= Solenofilomorpha justinei =

Scientific classification
- Domain: Eukaryota
- Kingdom: Animalia
- Phylum: Xenacoelomorpha
- Order: Acoela
- Family: Solenofilomorphidae
- Genus: Solenofilomorpha
- Species: S. justinei

Binomial name
- Solenofilomorpha justinei Nilsson, Wallberg & Jondelius, 2011

Species of acoel

Solenofilomorpha justinei is a species of acoel found in New Caledonia.
