= Isodiametra =

Scientific classification
- Kingdom: Animalia
- Phylum: Xenacoelomorpha
- Order: Acoela
- Family: Isodiametridae
- Genus: Isodiametra; Hooge & Tyler, 2005

Genus of flatworm-like animals

Isodiametra is a genus of worms belonging to the family Isodiametridae.

The species of this genus are found in Southern America.

== Species ==
Species:

- Isodiametra bajaensis Hooge & Eppinger, 2005
- Isodiametra colorata (Ehlers & Dörjes, 1979)
- Isodiametra cuernos Hooge & Tyler, 2008
