= Eumecynostomum =

Scientific classification
- Domain: Eukaryota
- Kingdom: Animalia
- Phylum: Xenacoelomorpha
- Order: Acoela
- Family: Mecynostomidae
- Genus: Eumecynostomum; Faubel & Regier, 1983

Genus of acoels

Eumecynostomum is a genus of acoels belonging to the family Mecynostomidae.

The species of this genus are found in Europe.

Species:

- Eumecynostomum altitudi Faubel & Regier, 1983
- Eumecynostomum asterium Hooge & Tyler, 2003
