= Actinoposthia =

Scientific classification
- Domain: Eukaryota
- Kingdom: Animalia
- Phylum: Xenacoelomorpha
- Order: Acoela
- Family: Actinoposthiidae
- Genus: Actinoposthia; An der Lan, 1936

Genus of acoels

Actinoposthia is a genus of acoels belonging to the family Actinoposthiidae.

Species:

- Actinoposthia beklemischevi Mamkaev, 1965
- Actinoposthia biaculeata Faubel, 1974
- Actinoposthia caudata An der Lan, 1936
- Actinoposthia longa Faubel, 1976
- Actinoposthia pigmentea Faubel, 1976
