= Haploposthia =

Scientific classification
- Domain: Eukaryota
- Kingdom: Animalia
- Phylum: Xenacoelomorpha
- Order: Acoela
- Family: Haploposthiidae
- Genus: Haploposthia; An der Lan, 1936

Genus of acoels

Haploposthia is a genus of acoels belonging to the family Proporidae.

The species of this genus are found in Europe and America.

== Species ==
Species:

- Haploposthia brunea An Der Lan, 1936
- Haploposthia erythrocephala Kozloff, 2000
- Haploposthia lactomaculata Tekle, 2004
- Haploposthia microphoca Marcus, 1950
- Haploposthia pellucidus (Westblad, 1942)
- Haploposthia rubra (An Der Lan, 1936)
- Haploposthia rubropunctata Westblad, 1945
- Haploposthia vandula Hooge & Tyler, 2001
