= Hofstenia =

Scientific classification
- Kingdom: Animalia
- Phylum: Xenacoelomorpha
- Order: Acoela
- Family: Hofsteniidae
- Genus: Hofstenia; Bock, 1923

Genus of acoels

Hofstenia, or panther worms, is a genus of acoels belonging to the family Hofsteniidae.

They are recognized for their ability to regenerate any missing tissue type and recover body axes following injury, including a functional brain during whole-body regeneration. The Hofstenia body is populated by neoblast-like cells, adult stem cells, which are necessary for Hofstenia regeneration, and are frequently studied in planarians.

Species:

- Hofstenia arabiensis Beltagi & Mandura, 1991
- Hofstenia atroviridis Bock, 1923
- Hofstenia beltagii Steinböck, 1966
- Hofstenia miamia Correa, 1960
- Hofstenia minuta Palombi, 1928
