= Faerlea =

Scientific classification
- Kingdom: Animalia
- Phylum: Xenacoelomorpha
- Order: Acoela
- Family: Isodiametridae
- Genus: Faerlea; Westblad, 1945

Genus of acoels

Faerlea is a genus of acoels belonging to the family Isodiametridae.

The species of this genus are found in Europe.

Species:

- Faerlea antora Marcus, 1952
- Faerlea echinocardii Dörjes, 1972
- Faerlea fragilis Westblad, 1945
- Faerlea glomerata Westblad, 1945
