= Afronta =

Scientific classification
- Domain: Eukaryota
- Kingdom: Animalia
- Phylum: Xenacoelomorpha
- Order: Acoela
- Family: Haploposthiidae
- Genus: Afronta; Hyman, 1944

Genus of acoels

Afronta is a genus of acoels belonging to the family Proporidae.

Species:

- Afronta aurantiaca Hyman, 1944
- Afronta rubra Faubel, 1976
