= Tetraposthia =

Scientific classification
- Domain: Eukaryota
- Kingdom: Animalia
- Phylum: Xenacoelomorpha
- Order: Acoela
- Family: Actinoposthiidae
- Genus: Tetraposthia; An der Lan, 1936
- Species: T. colymbetes

Binomial name
- Tetraposthia colymbetes An der Lan, 1936

Genus of acoels

Tetraposthia is a monotypic genus of acoels belonging to the family Actinoposthiidae. The only species is Tetraposthia colymbetes.
