= Limnoposthia =

Scientific classification
- Kingdom: Animalia
- Phylum: Xenacoelomorpha
- Order: Acoela
- Family: Mecynostomidae
- Genus: Limnoposthia; Faubel & Kolasa, 1978

Genus of acoels

Limnoposthia is a genus of acoels belonging to the family Mecynostomidae.

Species:

- Limnoposthia polonica (Kolasa & Faubel, 1974)

== Distribution and habitat ==
Limnoposthia polonica lives in freshwater.
