= Haplogonaria =

Scientific classification
- Kingdom: Animalia
- Phylum: Xenacoelomorpha
- Order: Acoela
- Family: Haploposthiidae
- Genus: Haplogonaria; Dörjes, 1968

Genus of acoels

Haplogonaria is a genus of acoels belonging to the family Proporidae.

The genus has an almost cosmopolitan distribution.

== Species ==
Species:

- Haplogonaria amarilla Hooge & Eppinger, 2005
- Haplogonaria arenaria (Ax, 1959)
- Haplogonaria baki Hooge & Tyler, 2015
- Haplogonaria elegans Faubel, 1976
- Haplogonaria glandulifera Dörjes, 1968
- Haplogonaria idia (Marcus, 1954)
- Haplogonaria macrobursalia Dörjes, 1968
- Haplogonaria minima (Westblad, 1946)
- Haplogonaria pellita (Marcus, 1951)
- Haplogonaria phyllospadicis Hooge & Tyler, 2003
- Haplogonaria psammalia Faubel, 1974
- Haplogonaria simplex Dörjes, 1968
- Haplogonaria sinubursalia Dörjes, 1968
- Haplogonaria sophiae Hooge & Rocha, 2006
- Haplogonaria stradbrokensis Hooge, 2003
