= The Virgin =

The Virgin may refer to:

== Religion ==
- Mary, the mother of Jesus
- Margaret the Virgin
- Virgo (constellation)
- Virgo (astrology)

== In media ==
- "The Virgin" (Seinfeld), television episode
- Jane the Virgin, a television series from 2014 to 2019
- The Virgin (film), a 1924 silent film by Alan James
- The Virgins (film), a 2016 film by Sandeep A. Varma
- "The Virgin", a song by Gene Clark from his 1971 album White Light
- The Virgins, an American indie rock band
- The Virgins (novel), a 2013 novel by Pamela Erens
- The Virgin (Klimt), a 1913 painting by Gustav Klimt

== Places ==
- The Virgin Islands, including:
  - The British Virgin Islands
  - The United States Virgin Islands
  - The Spanish Virgin Islands
- The Virgin (Purcell Mountains), a mountain in Canada

== Other uses ==
- La Pucelle (violin), also known as The Virgin, a 1709 violin made by Antonio Stradivari
