= Atriofronta =

Scientific classification
- Domain: Eukaryota
- Kingdom: Animalia
- Phylum: Xenacoelomorpha
- Order: Acoela
- Family: Actinoposthiidae
- Genus: Atriofronta; Dörjes, 1968

Genus of acoels

Atriofronta is a genus of acoels belonging to the family Actinoposthiidae.

Species:

- Atriofronta polyvacuola Dörjes, 1968
