= Archocelis =

Scientific classification
- Kingdom: Animalia
- Phylum: Xenacoelomorpha
- Order: Acoela
- Family: Otocelididae
- Genus: Archocelis; Dörjes, 1968

Genus of acoels

Archocelis is a genus of acoels belonging to the family Otocelididae.

== Location ==
Archocelis is found in Denmark.

== Species ==
- Archocelis macrorhabditis Dörjes, 1968
