= Adenocauda =

Scientific classification
- Kingdom: Animalia
- Phylum: Xenacoelomorpha
- Order: Acoela
- Family: Haploposthiidae
- Genus: Adenocauda; Dörjes, 1968

Genus of acoels

Adenocauda is a genus of acoels belonging to the family Proporidae.

Species:

- Adenocauda helgolandica Dörjes, 1968
