= Convoluella =

Scientific classification
- Domain: Eukaryota
- Kingdom: Animalia
- Phylum: Xenacoelomorpha
- Order: Acoela
- Family: Antroposthiidae
- Genus: Convoluella; Faubel, 1974

Genus of acoels

Convoluella is a genus of acoels belonging to the family Antroposthiidae.

Species:

- Convoluella brunea Faubel, 1974
