= Tauris =

Tauris is a name for Crimea. It may refer to:

- Taurica or Tauric Peninsula, ancient Greek names for Crimea
- Iphigenia in Tauris, ancient Greek play by Euripides
- Iphigenia in Tauris (Goethe), a reworking of the Euripides' play by Johann Wolfgang von Goethe

It may also refer to:

- Tauris, ancient name for Tabriz, Iran
- Tauris, likely ancient name for Šipan
- Tauris, possible ancient name for Šćedro
- 814 Tauris, minor planet orbiting the Sun
- I.B. Tauris, independent publishing house with offices in London and New York

== See also ==
- Tauri, an ancient people settled on the southern coast of the Crimean peninsula
- Taurida (disambiguation)
- Tauros (disambiguation)
- Taurus (disambiguation)
