= Nadina =

Scientific classification
- Domain: Eukaryota
- Kingdom: Animalia
- Phylum: Xenacoelomorpha
- Order: Acoela
- Family: Nadinidae; Dörjes, 1968
- Genus: Nadina; Uljanin, 1870

Species
- see text

Synonyms
- (Family): Myostomellidae Riedl, 1954; (Genus): Myostomella Riedl, 1954

Genus of acoels

Nadina is a genus of acoels. It is the only genus in the monotypic family Nadinidae.

== Species ==
There are three species recognised in the genus Nadina.

Name	Image	Distribution	Description
Nadina evelinae (Marcus, 1952)			
Nadina minuta Claparède, 1863			
Nadina pulchella Uljanin 1870			
