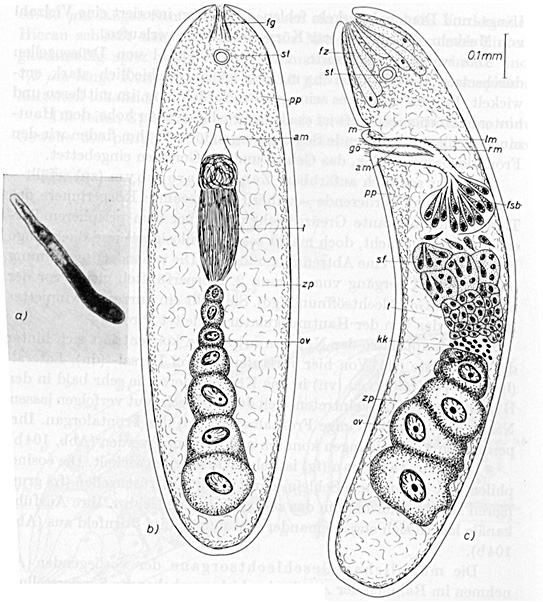

Scientific classification
- Kingdom: Animalia
- Phylum: Xenacoelomorpha
- Order: Acoela
- Family: Antigonariidae; Dörjes, 1968
- Genus: Antigonaria; Dörjes, 1968
- Species: A. arenaria

Binomial name
- Antigonaria arenaria Dörjes 1968

= Antigonaria =

Genus of acoels

Antigonaria is a genus of acoels. It is the only genus in the monotypic family Antigonariidae and is represented by a single species, Antigonaria arenaria.

== Taxonomy and habitat ==
The genus Antigonaria and its family Antigonariidae were established by the zoologist Jürgen Dörjes in 1968, in a taxonomic study of acoels from the German North Sea coast. The genus is classified within Acoela, a group belonging to the phylum Xenacoelomorpha. Its type species, Antigonaria arenaria, is a marine organism associated with sublittoral sandy habitats. The species was originally recorded from Germany, with published records documenting its occurrence in fine sand at a depth of approximately 5 metres.
