= Dakuidae =

Scientific classification
- Kingdom: Animalia
- Phylum: Xenacoelomorpha
- Order: Acoela
- Infraorder: Crucimusculata
- Family: Dakuidae; Hooge, 2003

Family of acoels

Dakuidae is a family of acoels.

== Taxonomy ==
=== Genera ===
There are three genera recognised in the family Dakuidae:

- Daku Hooge, 2003
- Notocelis Dörjes, 1968
- Philactinoposthia Dörjes, 1968

=== Species ===
There are 22 species recognised in the family Dakuidae:

Name	Image	Distribution	Description
Daku riegeri Hooge & Tyler, 2008		Panama	
Daku woorimensis Hooge, 2003		Australia	
Notocelis gullmarensis (Westblad, 1946)		Germany, Sweden, United Kingdom, Maine	
Notocelis maculata (Karling, Mack-Fira & Dörjes, 1972)		Hawaii	
Notocelis rubidocula Kozloff, 2000			
Notocelis subsalina (Ax, 1959)			
Philactinoposthia adenogonaria Dörjes 1968			
Philactinoposthia brevis Nilsson, Wallberg & Jondelius, 2011			
Philactinoposthia coneyi Hooge & Rocha, 2006			
Philactinoposthia diploposthia Dörjes 1968			
Philactinoposthia helgolandica Dörjes 1968			
Philactinoposthia ischiae Nilsson, Wallberg & Jondelius, 2011			
Philactinoposthia multipunctata Nilsson, Wallberg & Jondelius, 2011			
Philactinoposthia novaecaledoniae Nilsson, Wallberg & Jondelius, 2011			
Philactinoposthia pusilla (Westblad, 1946)			
Philactinoposthia rhammifera (Westblad, 1946)			
Philactinoposthia saliens (Graff, 1882)			
Philactinoposthia stylifera (Westblad, 1946)			
Philactinoposthia viridipunctata (Westblad, 1946) Dörjes & Karling, 1975			
Philactinoposthia tenebrosa Ehlers & Doerjes 1979			
Philactinoposthia viridis Dörjes 1968			
Philactinoposthia viridorhabditis Dörjes 1968			
