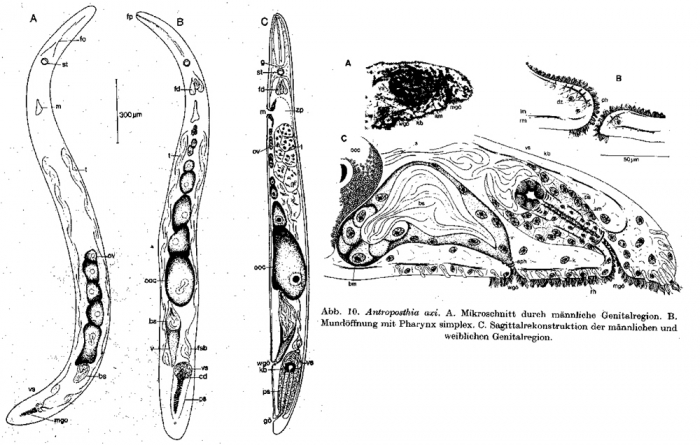
- Antroposthia axi

Scientific classification
- Kingdom: Animalia
- Phylum: Xenacoelomorpha
- Order: Acoela
- Family: Antroposthiidae; Faubel, 1976

Synonyms
- Antroposthidae

= Antroposthiidae =

Family of acoels

Antroposthiidae is a family of acoels, containing three genera and four species.

== Taxonomy ==
=== Genera ===
There are three genera in the family Antroposthiidae.

- Antroposthia Faubel, 1974
- Convoluella Faubel, 1974
- Unantra Faubel, 1976

=== Species ===
There are four species in the family Actinoposthiidae.

Name	Image	Distribution	Description
Antroposthia axi Faubel 1974		Sylt, North Sea	
Antroposthia unipora Faubel 1974		Sylt, North Sea, United Kingdom	
Convoluella brunea Faubel 1974		Sylt, North Sea	
Unantra polyvacuola Faubel 1976		Sylt, North Sea	
