= Mecynostomidae =

Scientific classification
- Kingdom: Animalia
- Phylum: Xenacoelomorpha
- Order: Acoela
- Superfamily: Aberrantospermata
- Family: Mecynostomidae; Dörjes, 1968

Genera
- Childia Graff, 1910; Eumecynostomum Faubel & Regier, 1983; Limnoposthia Faubel & Kolasa, 1978; Mecynostomum Beneden, 1870; Neomecynostomum Faubel & Regier, 1983; Paedomecynostomum Dörjes, 1968; Paramecynostomum Dörjes, 1968; Pelochildia Faubel & Warwick, 2005; Philomecynostomum Dörjes, 1968; Postmecynostomum Dörjes, 1968; Pseudmecynostomum Dörjes, 1968; Stylomecynostomum Hooge & Tyler, 2003

Synonyms
- Childiidae Dörjes, 1968

Family of acoels

Mecynostomidae is a family of acoels.

- Eumecynostomum altitudi Faubel & Regier, 1983
- Eumecynostomum asterium Hooge & Tyler, 2003
- Eumecynostomum bathycolum (Westblad, 1948)
- Eumecynostomum boreale (Faubel, 1977)
- Eumecynostomum evelinae (Marcus, 1948)
- Eumecynostomum flavescens (Dörjes, 1968)
- Eumecynostomum fragilis (Dörjes, 1968)
- Eumecynostomum juistensis (Dörjes, 1968)
- Eumecynostomum luridum Kozloff, 2000
- Eumecynostomum macrobursalium (Westblad, 1946)
- Eumecynostomum maritimum (Dörjes, 1968)
- Eumecynostomum pallidum (Beklemischev, 1915)
- Eumecynostomum papillosum (Faubel, 1974)
- Eumecynostomum tardum (Ehlers & Dörjes, 1979)
- Eumecynostomum westbladi (Dörjes, 1968)
- Limnoposthia polonica (Kolasa & Faubel, 1974)
- Mecynostomum auritum (Schultze, 1851)
- Mecynostomum caudatum (Uljanin, 1870)
- Mecynostomum filiferum Ax, 1963
- Mecynostomum haplovarium Dörjes, 1968
- Mecynostomum predatum Faubel, 1976
- Mecynostomum sanguineum (Beklemischev, 1915)
- Mecynostomum torquens Kozloff, 2000
- Neomecynostomum granulum (Dörjes, 1968)
- Paramecynostomum carchedonium Kozloff, 1998
- Paramecynostomum diversicolor (Ørsted, 1845)
- Philomecynostomum lapillum Dörjes, 1968
- Postmecynostomum glandulosum (Westblad, 1946)
- Postmecynostomum pictum Dörjes, 1968
- Stylomecynostomum bodegensis Hooge & Tyler, 2003
