= Tauros =

Tauros is a transliteration of either Ancient Greek: ταῦρος ('bull') or of Proto-Indo-European *táwros ('wild bull', 'aurochs') and may refer to:

- Tauros Programme, an international effort to breed back domestic cattle to resemble the aurochs
- Tauros, a Pokémon species

== See also ==
- Tauris (disambiguation)
- Taurus (disambiguation)
- Centaur
- Minotaur
- Taro (river) (Latin: Tarus)
- Torus
