= A Tauri =

The Bayer designation A Tauri (A Tau) is shared by two stars in the constellation Taurus:

- A^{1} Tauri (37 Tauri)
- A^{2} Tauri (39 Tauri)
