= Otocelididae =

Scientific classification
- Domain: Eukaryota
- Kingdom: Animalia
- Phylum: Xenacoelomorpha
- Order: Acoela
- Infraorder: Crucimusculata
- Family: Otocelididae; Westblad, 1948

Family of acoels

Otocelididae is a family of acoels.

== Taxonomy ==
=== Genera ===
There are five genera in the family Otocelididae:

- Archocelis Dörjes, 1968
- Exocelis Ehlers & Dörjes, 1979
- Haplotestis Dörjes, 1968
- Philocelis Dörjes, 1968
- Posticopora Kozloff, 2000

=== Species ===
The following species are recognised in the family Otocelididae.

Name (Note: A binomial authority in parentheses indicates that the species was originally described in a different genus.)	Image	Distribution	Description
Archocelis macrorhabdites Dörjes, 1968			
Archocelis macrorhabditis Dörjes, 1968			
Exocelis exopenis Ehlers & Dörjes, 1979			
Exocelis reedi Hooge & Tyler, 2008			
Haplotestis curvitubus Dörjes, 1968			
Philocelis brueggemanni Hooge & Tyler, 2003			
Philocelis cellata Dörjes 1968			
Philocelis karlingi (Westblad, 1946)			
Philocelis robrochai Hooge & Rocha, 2006			
Posticopora luteopunctata (Ehlers & Doerjes, 1979)			
