= Hallangiidae =

Scientific classification
- Kingdom: Animalia
- Phylum: Xenacoelomorpha
- Order: Acoela
- Infraorder: Prosopharyngida
- Family: Hallangiidae; Westblad, 1946

Family of acoels

Hallangiidae is a family of Acoela. It contains 2 species in 2 genera.

== Genera ==
There are two genera in the family Hallangiidae.

- Aechmalotus Beklemischev, 1915
- Hallangia Westblad, 1946

== Species ==
There are two species in the family Hallangiidae.

Name (Note: A binomial authority in parentheses indicates that the species was originally described in a different genus.)	Image	Distribution	Description
Aechmalotus pyrula Beklemischev, 1915			
Hallangia proporoides Westblad, 1946			
