= Taurida (disambiguation) =

Taurida is an old name for the Crimea.

Taurida, Tauride or Tavrida may also refer to:

- Tauride Palace, palace in Saint Petersburg (built 1783–89), named after the Prince of Taurida
- Taurida Oblast, province of the Russian Empire (1784–96)
- Taurida Governorate, governorate of the Russian Empire (1802–1921)
- Taurida Soviet Socialist Republic, ephemeral revolutionary state (1918)
- Tavrida National V.I. Vernadsky University, also called Taurida University (founded 1918)
- Taurien, a sub-district of the German Reichskommissariat Ukraine (1942–44)
- Taurida Military District of the Soviet Union (1945–56)
- Taurida fulvomaculata, a species of flatworm-like bilaterian native to the Black Sea
