= Aphanostoma =

Scientific classification
- Kingdom: Animalia
- Phylum: Xenacoelomorpha
- Order: Acoela
- Family: Isodiametridae
- Genus: Aphanostoma; Ørsted, 1845

Genus of flatworm-like animals

Aphanostoma is a genus of acoel flatworms in the family Isodiametridae. Individuals can grow to 5 mm. They rely on ocelli for vision, which are small, simple eyes found in many invertebrates, usually consisting of a few sensory cells and a single lens. They move around by ciliary gliding, which is a type of locomotion in which an animal moves on a secreted layer of mucus, propelled by the beating of cilia. It is characteristic of small, soft-bodied invertebrates.

The species of this genus are found in Europe.

== Species ==
This genus contains three species:

- Aphanostoma adherens Meixner, 1938
- Aphanostoma album Dörjes, 1968
- Aphanostoma aurantiacum Verrill, 1893
