= Hofsteniidae =

Scientific classification
- Kingdom: Animalia
- Phylum: Xenacoelomorpha
- Order: Acoela
- Infraorder: Prosopharyngida
- Family: Hofsteniidae; Bock, 1923

Family of acoels

Hofsteniidae is a family of acoels. This family contains seven species in three genera.

This worm ranges in size from 100 μm for embryos to 500 μm for adults, and exhibits "whole-body regeneration" capability, where entire body parts regenerate when removed from the body. They have a simple nervous system and a bowel sac with no way out.

== Genera ==
There are three genera in the family Hofsteniidae.

- Hofstenia Bock, 1923
- Hofsteniola Papi, 1957
- Marcusiola Steinböck, 1966

== Species ==
There are seven species in the family Hofsteniidae.

Name (Note: A binomial authority in parentheses indicates that the species was originally described in a different genus.)	Image	Distribution	Description
Hofstenia arabiensis Beltagi & Mandura, 1991			
Hofstenia atroviridis Bock, 1923			
Hofstenia beltagii Steinböck, 1966			
Hofstenia miamia Correa, 1960 ('three-banded panther worm')			
Hofstenia minuta Palombi, 1928			
Hofsteniola pardii Papi, 1957			
Marcusiola tinga (Marcus, 1957)			
