= Solenofilomorphidae =

Scientific classification
- Kingdom: Animalia
- Phylum: Xenacoelomorpha
- Order: Acoela
- Infraorder: Prosopharyngida
- Family: Solenofilomorphidae; Dörjes, 1968

Family of acoels

Solenofilomorphidae is a family of acoels.

== Genera ==
There are 5 genera in the family Solenofilomorphidae.

- Endocincta Crezee, 1975
- Fusantrum Crezee, 1975
- Myopea Crezee, 1975
- Oligofilomorpha Dörjes, 1971
- Solenofilomorpha Dörjes, 1968

== Species ==
There are 11 species in the family Solenofilomorphidae.

Name (Note: A binomial authority in parentheses indicates that the species was originally described in a different genus.)	Image	Distribution	Description
Endocincta punctata Crezee, 1975			
Fusantrum rhammiphorum Crezee, 1975			
Myopea crassula Crezee, 1975			
Myopea latafaucium Crezee, 1975			
Oligofilomorpha interstitiophilum Faubel, 1974			
Oligofilomorpha karlingi Dörjes, 1971			
Solenofilomorpha funilis Crezee, 1975			
Solenofilomorpha guaymensis Crezee, 1975			
Solenofilomorpha justinei Nilsson, Wallberg & Jondelius, 2011			
Solenofilomorpha longissima Dörjes, 1968			
Solenofilomorpha pellucida Kånneby & Jondelius, 2013			
