= Diopisthoporus =

Scientific classification
- Kingdom: Animalia
- Phylum: Xenacoelomorpha
- Order: Acoela
- Family: Diopisthoporidae; Westblad, 1940
- Genus: Diopisthoporus; Westblad, 1940

Genus of acoels

Diopisthoporus is a genus of acoels. It is the only genus in the monotypic family Diopisthoporidae.

== Species ==
There are five species recognised in the genus Diopisthoporus.

Name	Image	Distribution	Description
Diopisthoporus brachypharyngeus Dörjes, 1968			
Diopisthoporus gymnopharyngeus Smith & Tyler, 1985			
Diopisthoporus lofolitis Hooge & Smith, 2004			
Diopisthoporus longitubus Westblad, 1940			
Diopisthoporus psammophilus Dörjes, 1968			
