= Taurus Mountain =

Mountain in British Columbia, Canada

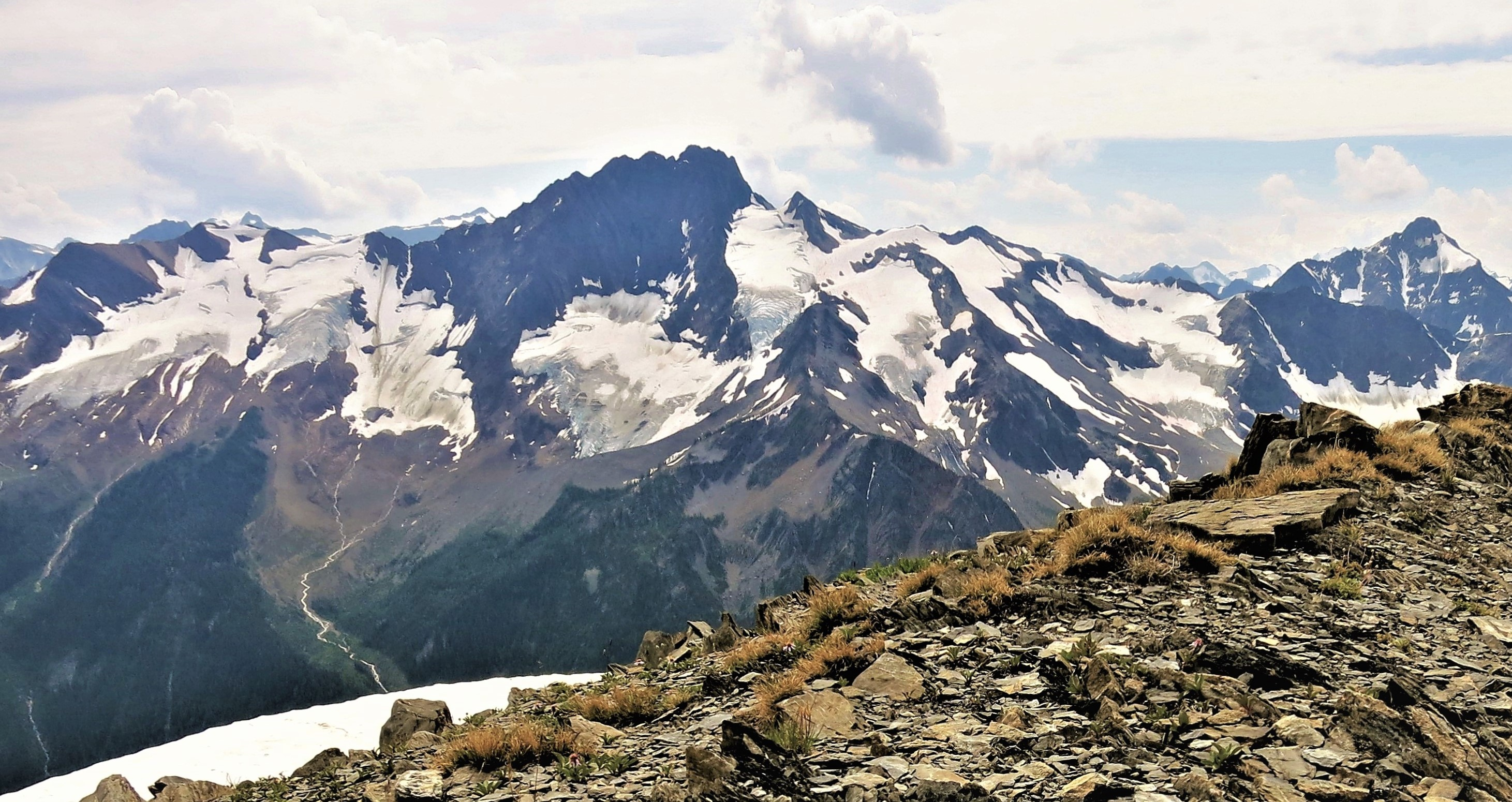
- North aspect, center (The Virgin far right)

Highest point
- Elevation: 2,972 m (9,751 ft)
- Prominence: 682 m (2,238 ft)
- Isolation: 6.32 km (3.93 mi)
- Listing: Mountains of British Columbia
- Coordinates: 50°40′04″N 116°36′26″W

Naming
- Etymology: Taurus

Geography
- Location within British Columbia Location within Canada
- Interactive map of Taurus Mountain
- Location: British Columbia, Canada
- District: Kootenay Land District
- Parent range: Purcell Mountains; Columbia Mountains
- Topo map: NTS 82K10 Howser Creek

Geology
- Rock age: Proterozoic
- Mountain type: Fault block

Climbing
- First ascent: 1946

Taurus Mountain is a mountain summit located in British Columbia, Canada.

== Description ==
Taurus Mountain is a 2,972-meter-elevation (9,751-foot) peak situated 12 kilometers (7.5 miles) southeast of The Bugaboos, in the Purcell Mountains which are a subrange of the Columbia Mountains. Precipitation runoff from Taurus Mountain drains southwest into the headwaters of Howser Creek thence Duncan Lake; and from the north slope into headwaters of Frances Creek and eventually the Columbia River. Topographic relief is significant as the summit rises over 1,280 meters (4,200 feet) above Frances Creek in two kilometers (1.2 miles).

== History ==
The name Taurus was applied to the mountain by Arthur O. Wheeler during his survey trip across Bugaboo Pass in 1910. Conrad Kain said that Wheeler called the mountain Taurus "because it was like a bull." From the Bugaboo region its general appearance suggests a formidable bull. The mountain's toponym was officially adopted June 9, 1960, by the Geographical Names Board of Canada.

The first ascent of the summit was made July 28, 1946, by Edward F. Little, Eugen Rosenstock-Huessy and Alex Fabergé.

The second ascent was made August 1, 1952, by three members of the Dartmouth Mountaineering Club: Peter Robinson, Bob Collins and Bill Briggs.

== Climate ==
Based on the Köppen climate classification, Taurus Mountain is located in a subarctic climate zone with cold, snowy winters, and mild summers. Temperatures in winter can drop below −20 °C with wind chill factors below −30 °C. This climate supports unnamed glaciers on the mountain's slopes.

== See also ==
- Geography of British Columbia
- Purcell Supergroup
