= The Virgin (Purcell Mountains) =

Mountain in British Columbia, Canada

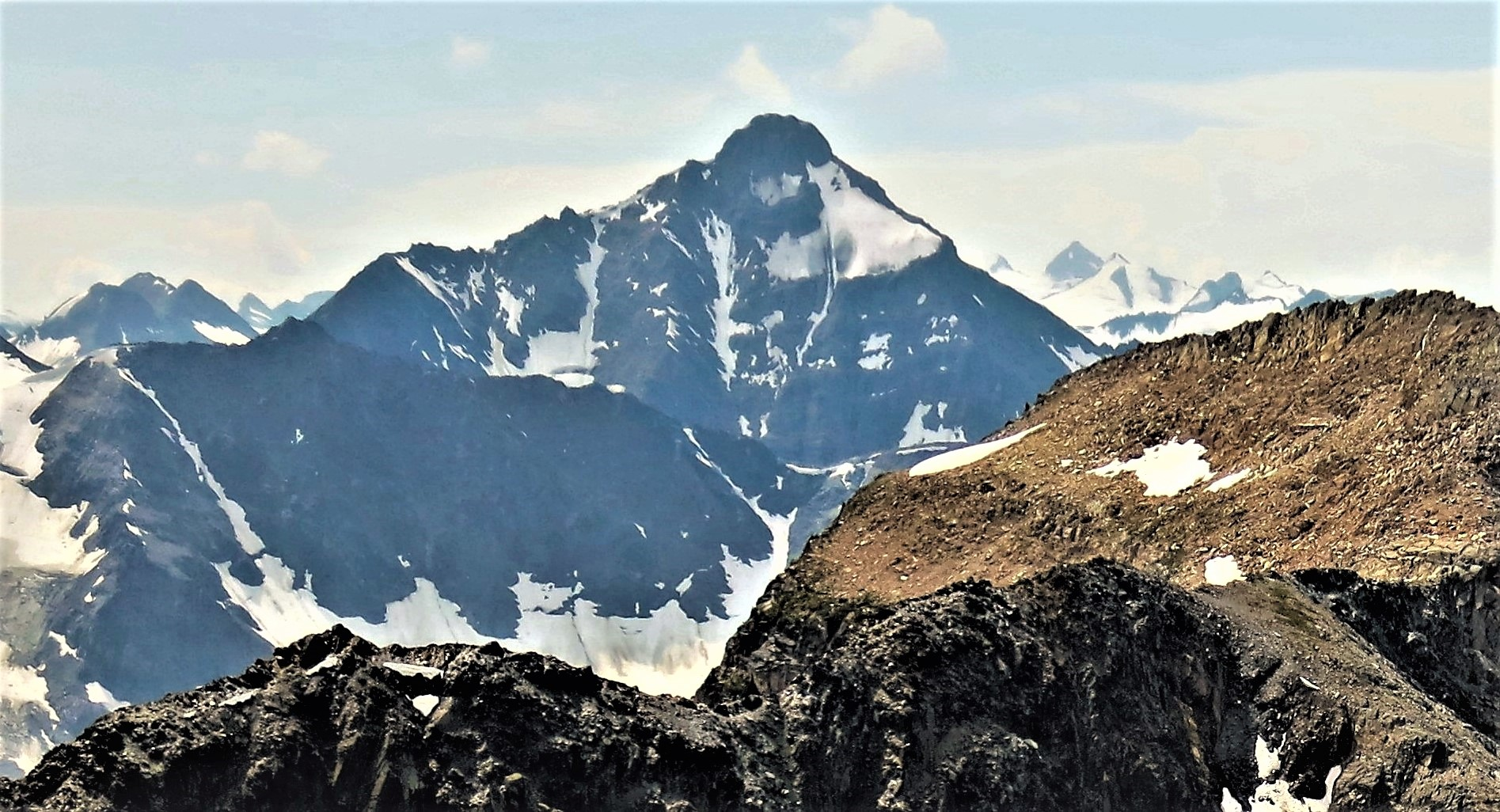
- North aspect

Highest point
- Elevation: 9,470 ft (2,886 m)
- Isolation: 3 km (1.9 mi)
- Listing: Mountains of British Columbia
- Coordinates: 50°39′15″N 116°38′27″W

Geography
- Location within British Columbia Location within Canada
- Interactive map of The Virgin
- Location: British Columbia, Canada
- District: Kootenay Land District
- Parent range: Purcell Mountains; Columbia Mountains
- Topo map: NTS 82K10 Howser Creek

Geology
- Rock age: Proterozoic
- Mountain type: Fault block
- Rock type: Quartzite

Climbing
- First ascent: 1952

The Virgin is a mountain summit located in British Columbia, Canada.

== Description ==
The Virgin is a 2,886-meter-elevation (9,469-foot) peak situated 12 kilometers (7.5 miles) southeast of The Bugaboos and three kilometers southwest of Taurus Mountain. The mountain is part of the Purcell Mountains which are a subrange of the Columbia Mountains. Precipitation runoff from The Virgin drains into the headwaters of Howser Creek which empties at Duncan Lake. Topographic relief is significant as the summit rises 1,525 meters (5,003 feet) above Howser Creek in two kilometers (1.2 miles).

== History ==
The mountain was discovered and named in 1946 by the climbing team which made the first ascent of nearby Taurus Mountain. The climbers, Edward F. Little and Eugen Rosenstock-Huessy, wrote: "The white snow-draped terraces of the peak were a beautiful sight, and this appearance, along with the stellar name of the neighbor which, though hidden, we knew was nearby, prompted us to name it for purposes of our own reference, 'Virgo' or the 'Virgin'." The mountain's toponym was officially adopted October 29, 1962, by the Geographical Names Board of Canada.

The first ascent of the summit was made August 2, 1952, by Peter Robinson, Bob Collins, Bill Briggs and John Briggs.

== Climate ==
Based on the Köppen climate classification, The Virgin is located in a subarctic climate zone with cold, snowy winters, and mild summers.Temperatures in winter can drop below −20 °C with wind chill factors below −30 °C.

== Gallery ==
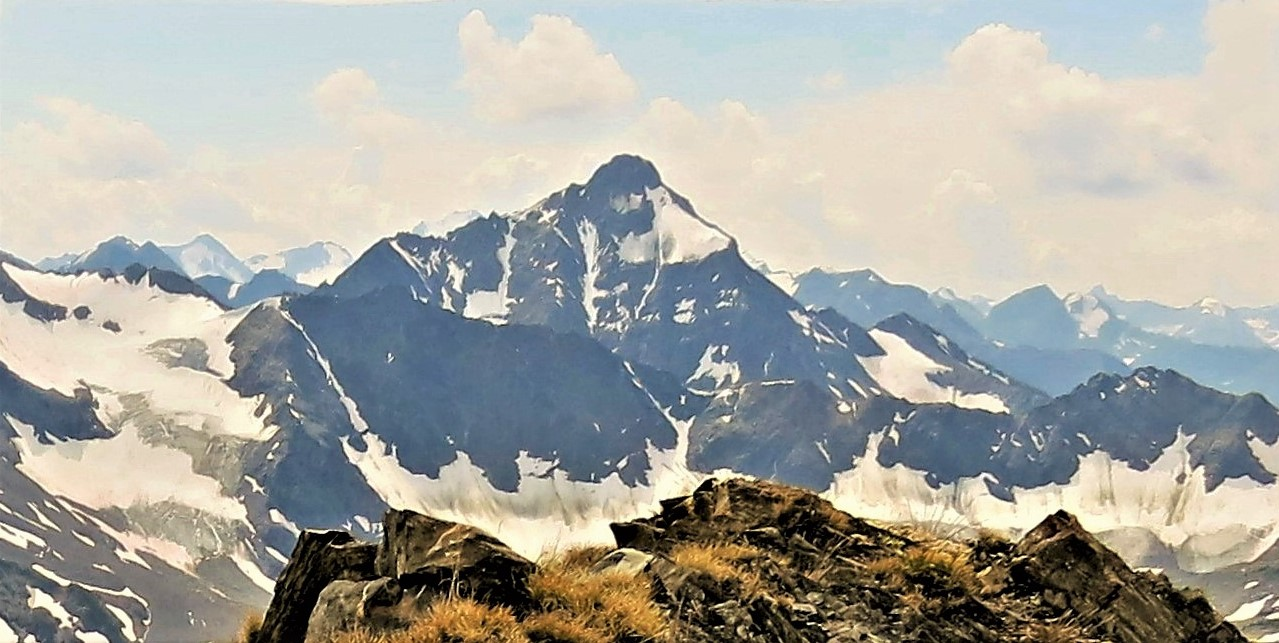
The Virgin, centered

== See also ==
- Geography of British Columbia
- Purcell Supergroup
