= 39 Tauri =

Star in the constellation Taurus

- Location of 39 Tauri (circled in red)

Observation data Epoch J2000 Equinox ICRS
- Constellation: Taurus
- Right ascension: 04^{h} 05^{m} 20.258^{s}
- Declination: +22° 00′ 32.06″
- Apparent magnitude (V): 5.90

Characteristics
- Evolutionary stage: main sequence
- Spectral type: G5 V
- U−B color index: +0.12
- B−V color index: +0.62

Astrometry
Radial velocity (R_{v})	+24.0±0.1 km/s
Proper motion (μ)	RA: +172.212 mas/yr Dec.: −130.609 mas/yr
Parallax (π)	59.4728±0.0361 mas
Distance	54.84 ± 0.03 ly (16.81 ± 0.01 pc)

Details
Mass	1.10±0.10 M_{☉}
Radius	0.96±0.07 R_{☉}
Luminosity	1.01 L_{☉}
Surface gravity (log g)	4.52±0.09 cgs
Temperature	5,903±36 K
Metallicity [Fe/H]	0.14±0.03 dex
Rotation	9.12 d
Rotational velocity (v sin i)	5.52 km/s
Age	1.0 Gyr

Other designations
- 39 Tau, BD+21 587, GJ 160, HD 25680, HIP 19076, HR 1262, SAO 76438

Database references
SIMBAD	data
ARICNS	data

39 Tauri is a binary star in the northern constellation of Taurus. It has an apparent visual magnitude of 5.90, so, according to the Bortle scale, it is faintly visible from suburban skies at night. Measurements made with the Hipparcos spacecraft show an annual parallax shift of 0.0594728″, which is equivalent to a distance of around 55 light-years from the Sun.

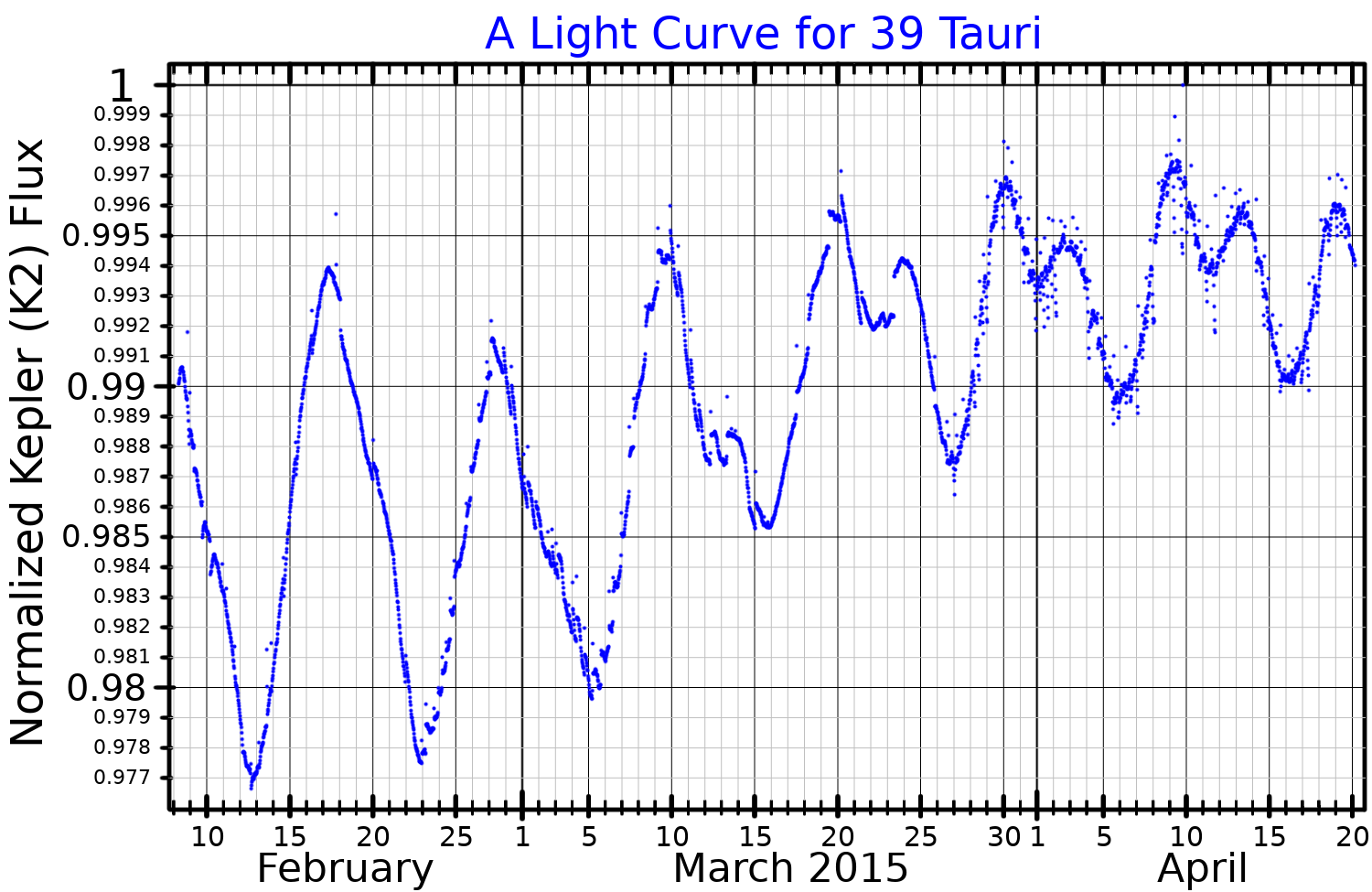
A light curve for 39 Tauri, plotted from Kepler (K2) data

39 Tauri has been resolved into a pair of stars using speckle interferometry. However, many observations have failed to resolve the secondary star.

A stellar classification of G5 V matches that of a G-type main-sequence star; the type of the secondary component is unknown. Stellar models indicate the primary component is similar in physical properties to the Sun, with 110% of the Sun's mass, 96% of the radius, and shining with almost the same luminosity. The overall metallicity of the star—the abundance of elements other than hydrogen and helium—is similar to the Sun. At a relatively youthful estimated age of one billion years, it is rotating with a period of 9.12 days. Based upon Hipparcos data, it displays a mild variability with an amplitude of 0.06 magnitude.

The space velocity components of 39 Tauri are: –25.0(U), –14.0(V), –6.0(W). The surface activity and kinematic properties of this star are consistent with membership in the IC 2391 moving group. It is following an orbit through the Milky Way galaxy that has an eccentricity of 0.06 carrying it as close as 23.9 kly (7.34 kpc) to the Galactic Center, and as far away as 26.8 kly (8.21 kpc). The orbital inclination will carry the star no further than 33 ly (10 pc) away from the galactic plane.
