= Taurida fulvomaculata =

Scientific classification
- Domain: Eukaryota
- Kingdom: Animalia
- Phylum: Xenacoelomorpha
- Order: Acoela
- Family: Taurididae; Kostenko, 1989
- Genus: Taurida; Kostenko, 1989
- Species: T. fulvomaculata

Binomial name
- Taurida fulvomaculata (Ax, 1959)

Species of acoel

Taurida fulvomaculata is a species of acoel. It is the only species in the monotypic genus Taurida and the monotypic family Taurididae.
