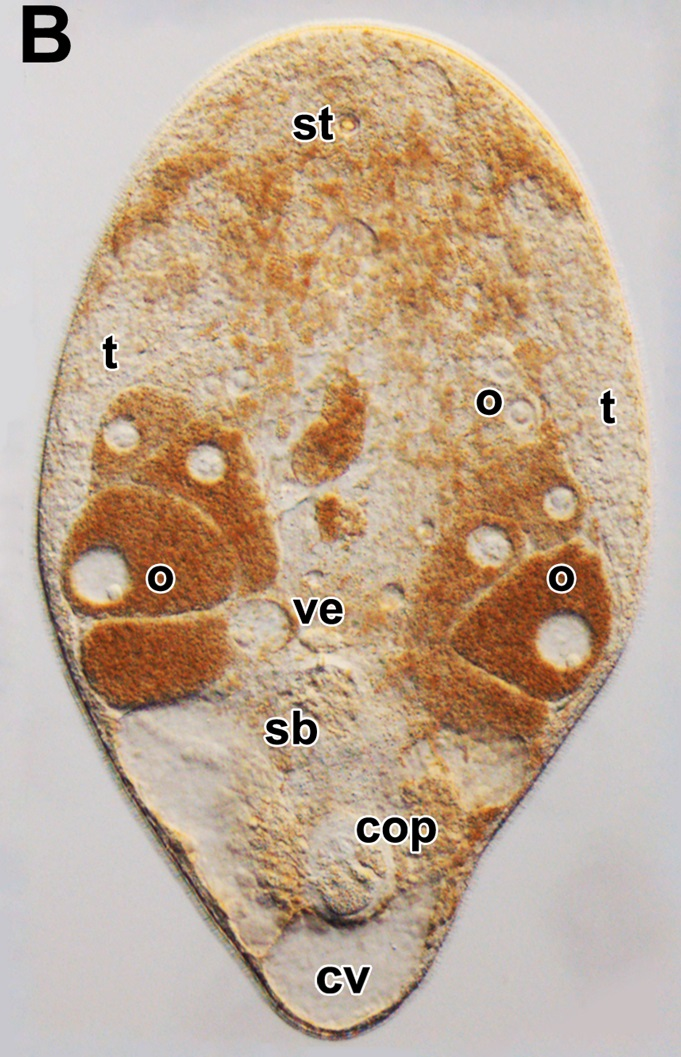
- Isodiametra pulchra

Scientific classification
- Kingdom: Animalia
- Phylum: Xenacoelomorpha
- Order: Acoela
- Infraorder: Crucimusculata
- Family: Isodiametridae; Hooge & Tyler, 2005

= Isodiametridae =

Family of flatworm-like animals

Isodiametridae is a family of acoels.

== Taxonomy ==
=== Genera ===
The following genera are recognised in the family Isodiametridae:

- Ancylocirrus Kozloff, 2000
- Aphanostoma Ørsted, 1845
- Archaphanostoma Dörjes, 1968
- Avagina Leiper, 1902
- Baltalimania Ax, 1959
- Bursosaphia Dörjes, 1968
- Diatomovora Kozloff, 1965
- Faerlea Westblad, 1945
- Haplocelis Dörjes, 1968
- Isodiametra Hooge & Tyler, 2005
- Otocelis Diesing, 1862
- Pharyngia Nilsson, Wallberg & Jondelius, 2011
- Postaphanostoma Dörjes, 1968
- Praeaphanostoma Dörjes, 1968
- Praeconvoluta Dörjes, 1968
- Proaphanostoma Dörjes, 1972
- Proconvoluta Dörjes, 1968
- Pseudaphanostoma Westblad, 1946
- Pseudoposthia Westblad, 1946
- Raphidophallus Kozloff, 1965
- Rimicola Bohmig, 1908 (Note: This genus is a junior homonym of Rimicola D. S. Jordan & Evermann, 1896, a genus of gobiesocid fishes, and thus needs to be replaced with a valid name.)

=== Species ===
There are over 100 species recognised in the family Isodiametridae:

Name (Note: A binomial authority in parentheses indicates that the species was originally described in a different genus.)	Image	Distribution	Description
Alluna sublitoralis Faubel & Regier, 1983			
Ancylocirrus ornatus Kozloff 2000			
Aphanostoma adherens Meixner, 1938			
Aphanostoma album Dörjes 1968			
Aphanostoma bruscai Hooge & Tyler, 2003			
Aphanostoma cavernosum Meixner 1938			
Aphanostoma chromocephalum Steinböck, 1933			
Aphanostoma collinae Hooge & Tyler, 2008			
Aphanostoma elegans Jensen 1878			
Aphanostoma fuscum Meixner, 1938			
Aphanostoma pisae Zauchner, Salvenmoser & Egger, 2015			
Aphanostoma rhomboides Jensen 1878			
Aphanostoma sanguineum Beklemischev, 1915			
Aphanostoma virescens Ørsted 1845			
Archaphanostoma agile (Jensen, 1878)			
Archaphanostoma fontaneti Kånneby, Bernvi & Jondelius, 2015			
Archaphanostoma histobursalis Dörjes 1968			
Archaphanostoma histobursalium Dörjes 1968			
Archaphanostoma macrospiriferum (Westblad, 1946)			
Archaphanostoma marcusi Hooge & Rocha, 2006			
Archaphanostoma occulta Kånneby, Bernvi & Jondelius, 2015			
Archaphanostoma sublittoralis Kånneby, Bernvi & Jondelius, 2015			
Archaphanostoma ylvae Kånneby, Bernvi & Jondelius, 2015			
Avagina glandulifera Westblad 1953			
Avagina marci Dörjes & Karling 1975			
Avagina polyvacuola Ehlers & Doerjes 1979			
Avagina sublitoralis Faubel 1976			
Avagina vivipara Hickman 1956			
Baltalimania kosswigi Ax, 1959			
Bursosaphia baltalimaniaformis Dörjes 1968			
Diatomovora amoena Kozloff 1965			
Diatomovora jacki Hooge & Tyler, 2008			
Faerlea antora Marcus 1952			
Faerlea echinocardii Dörjes, 1972			
Faerlea fragilis Westblad 1945			
Faerlea glomerata Westblad 1945			
Haplocelis dichona (Marcus, 1954)			
Isodiametra bajaensis Hooge & Eppinger, 2005			
Isodiametra colorata (Ehlers & Doerjes, 1979)			
Isodiametra cuernos Hooge & Tyler, 2008			
Isodiametra divae (Marcus, 1950)			
Isodiametra earnhardti (Hooge & Smith, 2004)			
Isodiametra finkei Kånneby & Jondelius, 2013			
Isodiametra helgolandica (Dörjes, 1968)			
Isodiametra hortulus (Hooge & Tyler, 2003)			
Isodiametra karpredi (Hooge & Tyler, 2003)			
Isodiametra marginalis (Ivanov, 1952)			
Isodiametra nicki Hooge & Tyler, 2008			
Isodiametra norvegica (Westblad, 1946)			
Isodiametra pulchra (Smith & Bush, 1991)			
Isodiametra urua (Marcus, 1954)			
Isodiametra variomorpha (Dörjes, 1968)			
Isodiametra vexillaria (Marcus, 1948)			
Isodiametra westbladi (Marcus, 1949)			
Otocelis erinae Hooge & Rocha, 2006			
Otocelis luteola (Kozloff, 1965)			
Otocelis phycophilus Ehlers & Doerjes, 1979			
Otocelis rubropunctata (Schmidt, 1852)			
Otocelis sachalinensis Ivanov, 1952			
Otocelis sandara Hooge & Tyler, 2003			
Otocelis westbladi Ax 1959			
Pharyngia furva Nilsson, Wallberg & Jondelius, 2011			
Postaphanostoma atriomagnum Dörjes 1968			
Postaphanostoma filum Dörjes 1968			
Postaphanostoma glandulosum Dörjes 1968			
Postaphanostoma nilssoni Kånneby & Jondelius, 2013			
Praeaphanostoma brevifrons Dörjes 1968			
Praeaphanostoma chaetocaudatum Dörjes 1968			
Praeaphanostoma foramivora Hooge & Tyler, 2008			
Praeaphanostoma gusana Hooge & Eppinger, 2005			
Praeaphanostoma longum Dörjes 1968			
Praeaphanostoma musculosum Ehlers & Doerjes 1979			
Praeaphanostoma parvum Rieger & Ott 1971			
Praeaphanostoma rubrum Dörjes 1968			
Praeaphanostoma sizilianum (Riedl, 1954)			
Praeaphanostoma thalasophilum Ehlers & Doerjes, 1979			
Praeaphanostoma vitreum Ehlers & Doerjes 1979			
Praeaphanostoma wadsworthi Hooge & Tyler, 2003			
Praeconvoluta bocasensis Hooge & Tyler, 2008			
Praeconvoluta castinea Hooge & Tyler, 2003			
Praeconvoluta karinae Dörjes 1968			
Praeconvoluta minor Faubel 1974			
Praeconvoluta schmidti Faubel 1977			
Praeconvoluta stephania Faubel & Regier, 1983			
Praeconvoluta tigrina Hooge & Tyler, 2003			
Praeconvoluta tornuva Tyler & Hooge 1999			
Proaphanostoma tenuissima (Westblad, 1946)			
Proaphanostoma tenuissimum (Westblad, 1946) Dörjes, 1972			
Proconvoluta primitiva Dörjes 1968			
Pseudaphanostoma brevicaudatum Dörjes 1968			
Pseudaphanostoma divae Marcus 1952			
Pseudaphanostoma herringi Hooge & Rocha, 2006			
Pseudaphanostoma hyalinorhabdoida Kånneby & Jondelius, 2013			
Pseudaphanostoma murmanicus (Mamkaev, 1967)			
Pseudaphanostoma pelophilum Dörjes 1968			
Pseudaphanostoma psammophilum Dörjes, 1968			
Pseudaphanostoma smithrii Hooge & Tyler, 2003			
Pseudaphanostoma syltensis Dörjes, 1968			
Pseudaphanostoma variabilis Westblad 1946			
Pseudoposthia macrogonopora Westblad 1946			
Raphidophallus actuosus Kozloff 1965			
Rimicola glacialis Böhmig, 1908			
