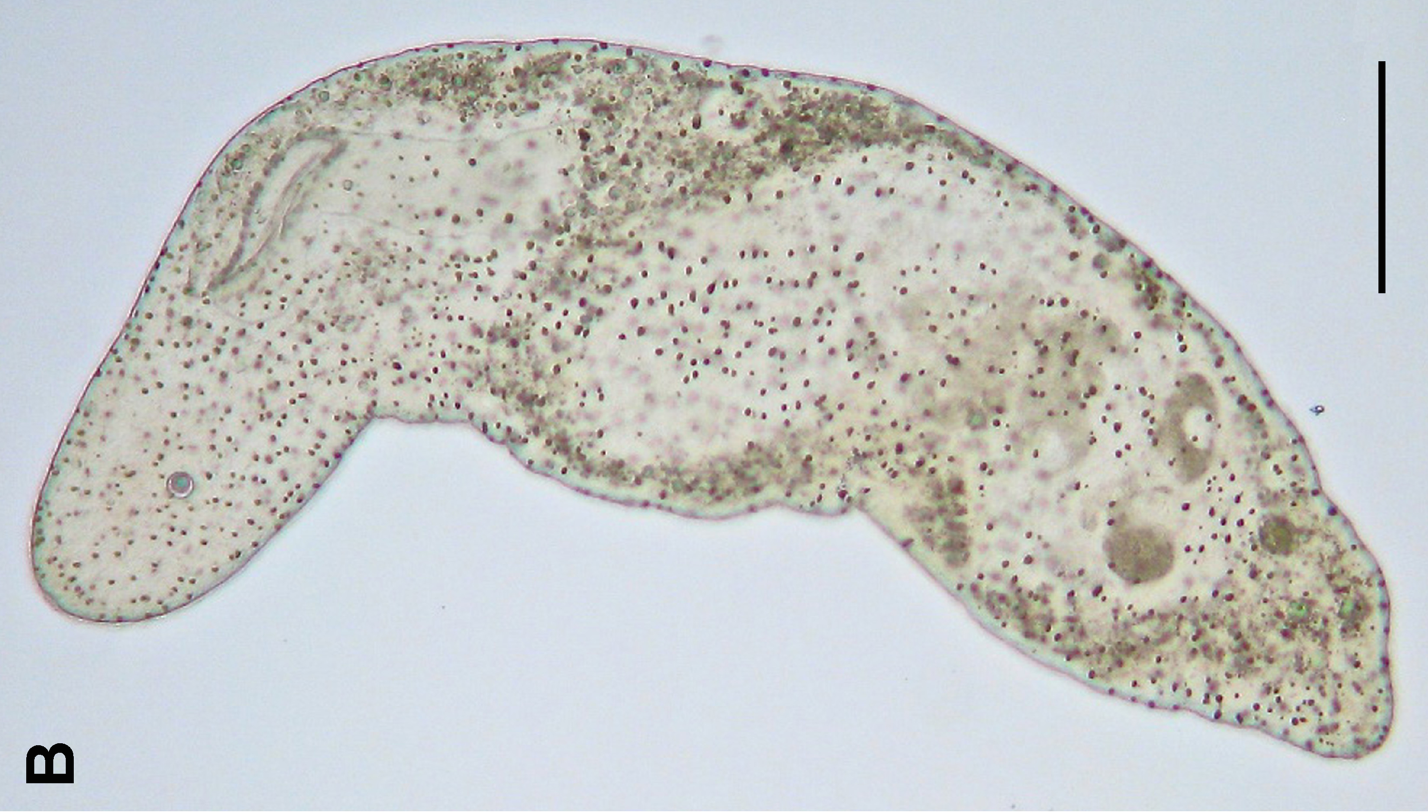
- Proporus sp.

Scientific classification
- Domain: Eukaryota
- Kingdom: Animalia
- Phylum: Xenacoelomorpha
- Order: Acoela
- Infraorder: Crucimusculata
- Family: Proporidae; Graff, 1882

Synonyms
- Haploposthiidae Westblad, 1948; Polycanthiidae Hooge, 2003

= Proporidae =

Family of acoels

Proporidae is a family of acoels.

== Taxonomy ==
=== Genera ===
There are 14 genera recognised in the family Proporidae.

- Adenocauda Dörjes, 1968
- Afronta Hyman, 1944
- Deuterogonaria Dörjes, 1968
- Haplogonaria Dörjes, 1968
- Haploposthia An der Lan, 1936
- Kuma Marcus, 1950
- Parahaplogonaria Dörjes, 1968
- Parahaploposthia Dörjes, 1968
- Polycanthus Hooge, 2003
- Praeanaperus Faubel & Regier, 1983
- Proporus Schmidt, 1848
- Pseudohaplogonaria Dörjes, 1968
- Pseudokuma Dörjes, 1968
- Simplicomorpha Dörjes, 1968

=== Species ===
The following species are recognised.

Name (Note: A binomial authority in parentheses indicates that the species was originally described in a different genus.)	Image	Distribution	Description
Adenocauda helgolandica Dörjes, 1968			
Afronta aurantiaca Hyman, 1944			
Afronta rubra Faubel, 1976			
Deuterogonaria carribea (Achatz, Hooge & Tyler, 2007)			
Deuterogonaria renei (Achatz & Hooge, 2006)			
Deuterogonaria thauma (Marcus, 1952)			
Haplogonaria amarilla Hooge & Eppinger, 2005			
Haplogonaria arenaria (Ax, 1959)			
Haplogonaria baki Hooge & Tyler, 2015			
Haplogonaria elegans Faubel, 1976			
Haplogonaria glandulifera Dörjes, 1968			
Haplogonaria idia (Marcus, 1954)			
Haplogonaria macrobursalia Dörjes, 1968			
Haplogonaria macrobursalis Dörjes, 1968			
Haplogonaria minima (Westblad, 1946)			
Haplogonaria pellita (Marcus, 1951)			
Haplogonaria phyllospadicis Hooge & Tyler, 2003			
Haplogonaria psammalia Faubel, 1974			
Haplogonaria schillingi Hooge & Tyler, 2015			
Haplogonaria simplex Dörjes, 1968			
Haplogonaria sinubursalia Dörjes, 1968			
Haplogonaria sophiae Hooge & Rocha, 2006			
Haplogonaria stradbrokensis Hooge, 2003			
Haploposthia brunea An Der Lan, 1936			
Haploposthia erythrocephala Kozloff, 2000			
Haploposthia lactomaculata Tekle, 2004			
Haploposthia microphoca Marcus, 1950			
Haploposthia pellucidus (Westblad, 1942)			
Haploposthia rubra (An der Lan, 1936)			
Haploposthia rubropunctata Westblad, 1945			
Haploposthia vandula Hooge & Tyler, 2001			
Kuma albiventer (Marcus, 1954)			
Kuma asilhas Hooge & Rocha, 2006			
Kuma belca Marcus, 1952			
Kuma blacki Hooge & Tyler, 2008			
Kuma brevicauda Marcus, 1950			
Kuma flava Hooge & Smith, 2004			
Kuma monogonophora (Westblad, 1946)			
Kuma viridis (An der Lan, 1936)			
Parahaplogonaria maxima Dörjes, 1968			
Parahaploposthia avesicula Dörjes, 1968			
Parahaploposthia brunea Faubel, 1976			
Parahaploposthia cerebroepitheliata Dörjes, 1968			
Parahaploposthia longituba Hooge & Tyler, 2007			
Parahaploposthia thiophilus Fegley, Smith & Rieger, 1984			
Parahaploposthia velvetum Hooge & Tyler, 2001			
Polycanthus torosus Hooge, 2003			
Praeanaperus tetraposthia Faubel & Regier, 1983			
Praeanaperus tetraposthis Faubel & Regier, 1983			
Proporus bermudensis Hooge & Tyler, 2001			
Proporus brochi Westblad, 1945			
Proporus brochii Westblad, 1946			
Proporus carolinensis Hooge & Smith, 2004			
Proporus lonchitis Dörjes, 1971			
Proporus minimus (An der Lan, 1936)			
Proporus venenosus (Schmidt, 1852)			
Pseudohaplogonaria cerasina Hooge & Smith, 2004			
Pseudohaplogonaria minima Ehlers & Dörjes, 1979			
Pseudohaplogonaria opisthandropora (Mamkaev, 1971)			
Pseudohaplogonaria rodmani Hooge & Tyler, 2007			
Pseudohaplogonaria sutcliffei (Hanson, 1961)			
Pseudohaplogonaria vacua Dörjes, 1968			
Pseudohaplogonaria viridipunctata (Westblad, 1946)			
Pseudokuma orphinum (Marcus, 1950)			
Simplicomorpha gigantorhabditis Dörjes, 1968			
Simplicomorpha viridis Dörjes, 1968			
