= Taurus =

Taurus is Latin for 'bull' and may refer to:

- Taurus (astrology), the astrological sign
  - Vṛṣabha, in vedic astrology
- Taurus (constellation), one of the constellations of the zodiac
- Taurus (mythology), one of two Greek mythological characters named Taurus
- Bos taurus, or Taurus cattle, a species of cattle

== Geography ==
- Taurus Mountains, a range in modern-day Turkey
- Montes Taurus, a mountainous region on the Moon
- Taurus Mountain, a summit in Canada

== People ==
- Tarrus Riley, reggae singer who initially worked as a deejay under the name Taurus
- Black Taurus (born 1987), Mexican wrestler also known as Taurus
- Gran Guerrero (born 1993), Mexican wrestler formerly known as Taurus
- Polo G (Taurus Bartlett, born 1999), American rapper

=== Romans ===
- Titus Statilius Taurus, the name of a line of four Roman senators
- Titus Statilius Taurus Corvinus, Roman consul in 45
- Lucius Calvenus Taurus, 2nd century Middle Platonist philosopher
- Taurus Volusianus, Roman consul in 261
- Taurus (consul 361), Roman consul in 361
- Taurus (consul 428), Roman consul in 428, nephew of the previous
- Taurus Seleucus Cyrus, better known as Cyrus of Panopolis, Roman consul in 441 and writer

=== Egyptians ===
- Taurus (ruler), An ancient Egyptian ruler whose existence is disputed.

=== Fictional characters ===
- Taurus (Marvel Comics), a Marvel Comics villain
- Taurus (G.I. Joe), a character in the G.I. Joe universe
- Taurus, a.k.a. Ox, a character in the Mega Man Star Force TV series
- Taurus Bulba, a villain in the animated television series Darkwing Duck

== Film ==
- Taurus (2001 film), a Russian film
- Taurus (2022 film), an American film directed by Tim Sutton

== Music ==
- Moog Taurus, a synthesizer; including the Taurus I, Taurus II, Taurus III
- Taurus, a former band name of the Danish pop group TV-2
- Taurus (group), a girl band
  - "Taurus Here", a 2005 song by Taurus
- "Taurus" (instrumental), a 1968 rock instrumental by Spirit
- Taurus I, Five Miles Out (Taurus II) and Taurus III, a trilogy of musical pieces by Mike Oldfield in the 1980s

== Vehicles ==
=== Military ===
- Taurus space launch vehicle, later named Minotaur-C
- Taurus KEPD 350, a cruise missile
- HMS Taurus, two ships of the Royal Navy
- USNS Taurus (T-AK-273), a vehicle landing ship
- USS Taurus (AF-25), a WWII cargo ship
- USS Taurus (PHM-3), hydrofoil
- Bristol Taurus, a 1936 aircraft piston engine
- Canadian Taurus Armoured Recovery Vehicle, based on the Leopard 1 tank
- XSSM-N-4 Taurus, a proposed unmanned version of the North American AJ Savage bomber
- TAURUS 4-1, a Lithuanian military vehicle

=== Civilian ===
- Ford Taurus, a full-size sedan (previously mid-size from 1986 to 2007) produced by the Ford Motor Company from 1986 to 2019
  - Ford Taurus (China), a full-size sedan produced by Changan Ford since 2016
- South Devon Railway locomotive Taurus, a 0-6-0ST steam locomotive
- The Taurus Express (Toros Ekspresi), a Turkish passenger train
- Pipistrel Taurus, a two-seat, self launching ultralight sailplane
- ST Taurus, a tug in service with Panfido Rim., Italy 1949–1984
- Taurus (locomotive), a widely known name for the EuroSprinter 64 U+ locomotive
- Taurus II space launch vehicle, the former name of the American Antares rocket launch vehicle
- TrailMaster Taurus, UTV

=== Law enforcement ===
- Ford Police Interceptor Sedan, police version of the Ford Taurus

== Business ==
- Taurus (manufacturer), a Brazilian gun manufacturer
- Taurus Impact Systems, a business software producer and the precursor to Bullfrog Productions
- TAURUS (share trading), an unsuccessful IT project at the London Stock Exchange

== Other ==
- Operation Taurus, a planned prosecution against Irish politician Martin McGuinness

== See also ==
- Tauris (disambiguation)
- Tauros (disambiguation)
- Centaur
- Minotaur
- Taro (river) (Latin: Tarus)
- Torus
