= Actinoposthiidae =

Scientific classification
- Kingdom: Animalia
- Phylum: Xenacoelomorpha
- Order: Acoela
- Family: Actinoposthiidae; Hooge, 2001

Family of acoels

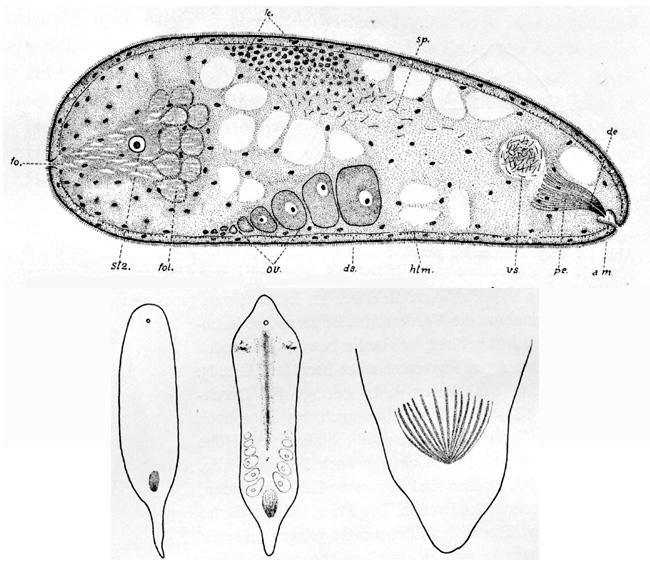
Drawing of actinoposthia caudata

Actinoposthiidae is a family of acoels.

== Taxonomy ==
=== Genera ===
The following genera are recognised in the family Actinoposthiidae:

- Actinoposthia An der Lan, 1936
- Alluna Faubel & Regier, 1983
- Archactinoposthia Dörjes, 1968
- Atriofronta Dörjes, 1968
- Childianea Faubel & Cameron, 2001
- Microposthia Faubel, 1974
- Paractinoposthia Ehlers & Dörjes, 1981
- Paraproporus Westblad, 1945
- Pseudactinoposthia Dörjes, 1968
- Tetraposthia An der Lan, 1936

=== Species ===
There are 21 species recognised in the family Actinoposthiidae.

Name (Note: A binomial authority in parentheses indicates that the species was originally described in a different genus.)	Image	Distribution	Description
Actinoposthia beklemischevi Mamkaev, 1965		Russia	
Actinoposthia biaculeata Faubel, 1974		Sylt, Germany	
Actinoposthia caudata An der Lan, 1936		Greenland	
Actinoposthia longa Faubel, 1976		Sylt	
Actinoposthia pigmentea Faubel, 1976		North Sea	
Archactinoposthia pelophila Dörjes, 1968		Germany	
Atriofronta polyvacuola Dörjes, 1968		Germany	
Childianea coomerensis Faubel & Cameron, 2001		Australia	
Microposthia listensis Faubel, 1974		Sylt	
Paractinoposthia pseudovesicula (Ehlers & Doerjes, 1979)		Ecuador	
Paraproporus diovatus Dörjes, 1968		Germany	
Paraproporus elegans (An der Lan, 1936)		Greenland	
Paraproporus rosettiforme Faubel, 1974			
Paraproporus rosettiformis Faubel, 1974		Sylt	
Paraproporus rubescens Westblad, 1945		Croatia, Sweden	
Paraproporus xanthus Marcus, 1950		Brazil	
Pseudactinoposthia daena (Marcus, 1954)		Brazil	
Pseudactinoposthia granaria Dörjes, 1968		Germany	
Pseudactinoposthia parva Ehlers & Doerjes, 1979		Ecuador	
Pseudactinoposthia saltans Dörjes, 1968		Germany	
Tetraposthia colymbetes An der Lan, 1936		Greenland	
