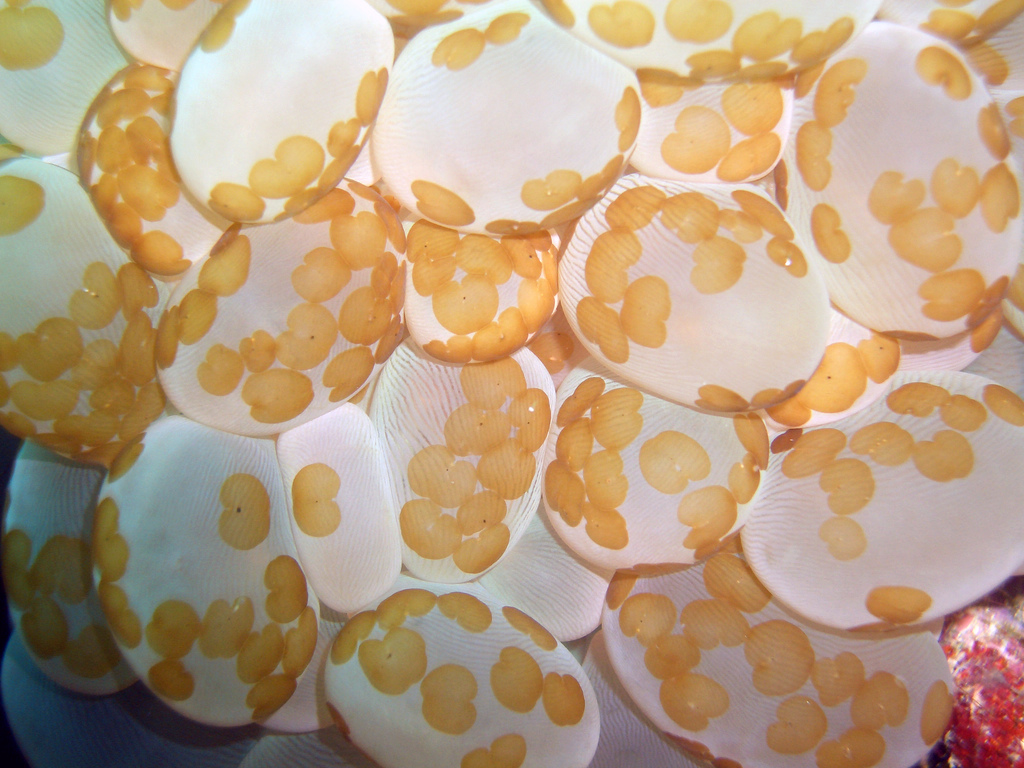
- Many flatworm-like, orange individuals of the Waminoa acoel on a Plerogyra coral (whitish bubbles)

Scientific classification
- Kingdom: Animalia
- Phylum: Xenacoelomorpha
- Subphylum: Acoelomorpha
- Order: Acoela; Uljanin, 1870

= Acoela =

Acoela Temporal range: Middle Triassic–Recent

Order of flatworm-like bilaterian animals

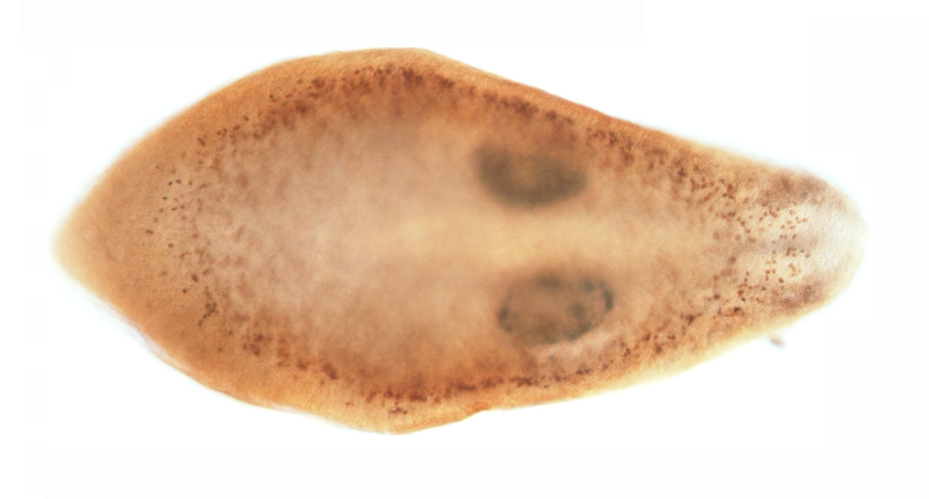
Neochildia fusca, a member of Convolutidae (= Anaperidae)

Acoela, or the acoels, is an order of small and simple invertebrates in the subphylum Acoelomorpha of phylum Xenacoelomorpha, a deep-branching bilaterian group of animals, which resemble flatworms. Historically, they were treated as an order of turbellarian flatworms. About 400 species are known, but probably many more are not yet described.

The etymology of "acoel" is from the Ancient Greek words ἀ (a), the alpha privative, expressing negation or absence, and κοιλία (koilía), meaning "cavity". This refers to the fact that acoels have a structure lacking a fluid-filled body cavity.

== Description ==
Acoels are very small, flattened worms, usually under 2 millimetres (0.079 in) in length, but some larger species, such as Symsagittifera roscoffensis, may reach up to 15 millimetres (0.59 in). They are bilaterally symmetric and microscopic.

They are found worldwide in marine and brackish waters, usually having a benthic lifestyle, although some species are epibionts. Two species, Limnoposthia polonica and Oligochoerus limnophilus, are known to live in freshwater.

Species in the family Convolutidae often form endosymbiotic relationship with microalgae. In one of the genera, Waminoa, the algae are transmitted vertically from parents to offspring. In addition to Convolutidae, there appears to be a potential new and yet unnamed family of acoels that also live in relationships with microalgal endosymbionts.

Members of the class Acoela lack a conventional gut, so that the mouth opens directly into the mesenchyme, i.e., the layer of tissue that fills the body. Digestion is accomplished by means of a syncytium that forms a vacuole around ingested food. There are no epithelial cells lining the digestive vacuole, but in the families Diopisthoporidae, Hallangiidae, Hofsteniidae, and Solenofilomorphidae, and the genera Oligochoerus (Convolutidae) and Proporus (Proporidae), there is a short pharynx leading from the mouth to the vacuole. All other bilateral animals (apart from tapeworms) have a gut lined with epithelial cells. As a result, the acoels appear to be solid-bodied.

The Acoela provide interesting insights into early animal evolution and development. The most thoroughly studied animal in this group is the species Isodiametra pulchra.

== Taxonomy ==
Acoela used to be classified in the phylum Platyhelminthes. However, Acoela was separated from this phylum after molecular analyses showed that it had diverged before the three main bilaterian clades had formed, making flatworms, as traditionally understood, an evolutionary grade rather than a monophyletic clade.

Acoela is considered a member of the phylum Xenacoelomorpha, within which it is sister to the Nemertodermatida. However, this apparent relationship may result erroneously from long branch attraction, with Acoela instead forming a clade with Xenoturbella.

The following sub-taxa are recognised in the order Acoela:

- Family Actinoposthiidae Hooge, 2001
- Family Antigonariidae Dörjes, 1968
- Family Antroposthiidae Faubel, 1976
- Family Diopisthoporidae Westblad, 1940
- Family Nadinidae Dörjes, 1968
- Family Paratomellidae Dörjes, 1966
- Family Taurididae Kostenko, 1989
- Suborder Bursalia Jondelius et al., 2011
  - Infraorder Crucimusculata Jondelius et al., 2011
    - Family Dakuidae Hooge, 2003
    - Family Isodiametridae Hooge & Tyler, 2005
    - Family Otocelididae Westblad, 1948
    - Family Proporidae Graff, 1882
    - Superfamily Aberrantospermata Jondelius et al., 2011
      - Family Convolutidae Graff, 1905
      - Family Mecynostomidae Dörjes, 1968
  - Infraorder Prosopharyngida Jondelius et al., 2011
    - Family Hallangiidae Westblad, 1946
    - Family Hofsteniidae Bock, 1923
    - Family Solenofilomorphidae Dörjes, 1968
