= List of people with surname O'Meara =

O'Meara
- Pronunciation: oh-MARA
- Language: English, from Irish

Origin
- Meaning: "descendant of Meara" (merry one)
- Region of origin: County Tipperary, Ireland

O'Meara (Meara, O'Mara, Mara, Marah) is an Irish surname, anglicised from Ó Meadhra, originating in County Tipperary in Ireland.

== Notable O'Mearas ==
- Andrew P. O'Meara (1907–2005), United States Army general
- Barry Edward O'Meara (1786–1836), Irish surgeon
- Basil O'Meara (1892–1971), Canadian sports journalist
- Brian O'Meara (rugby union) (born 1976), Irish rugby union footballer
- Brian O'Meara (Kilruane MacDonagh's hurler) (born 1990), Irish hurler
- Brian O'Meara (Mullinahone hurler) (born 1973), Irish hurler for the Tipperary senior team
- Colin O'Meara (born 1963), voice actor
- David O'Meara, Canadian poet
- Dermod O'Meara, Irish physician, poet and parent of Edmund O'Meara
- Edmund O'Meara (1614–1681), Irish physiologist and child of Dermod O'Meara
- Edward O'Meara (1921–1992), American prelate of the Roman Catholic Church
- Eileen O'Meara, American artist
- Eleanor O'Meara (died 2000), Canadian figure skater
- Frank O'Meara (1853–1888), Irish artist
- Frank O'Meara, Irish songwriter
- Ger O'Meara (born 1985), hurler and Gaelic footballer
- Jaeger O'Meara (born 1994), professional Australian rules footballer
- James O'Meara (1919–1974), Royal Air Force officer and fighter pilot
- Jane O'Meara Sanders (born 1950), American social worker, college administrator and political staffer
- Paki O'Meara (born 1988), Samoan-American former football player for the University of Iowa Hawkeyes
- Jo O'Meara (born 1979), English singer-songwriter, television personality and actress
- John Corbett O'Meara (born 1933), United States federal judge
- John O'Meara (politician) (1856–1904), Liberal Party Member of Parliament in New Zealand
- John J. O'Meara (1915–2003), Irish classical scholar and historian of ancient and medieval philosophy
- Kathleen O'Meara (politician) (born 1960), Irish politician
- Kathleen O'Meara (writer) (1839–1888), Irish-French Catholic writer
- Mark O'Meara (born 1957), American professional golfer
- Martin O'Meara (1885–1935), Irish-born Australian recipient of the Victoria Cross
- Mike O'Meara (born 1959), podcast personality
- O. Timothy O'Meara (1928–2018), American mathematician
- Patrick O'Meara (born 1947), Master of Van Mildert College and Professor at Durham University
- Patrick O. O'Meara (1938–2021), author and professor
- Peter O'Meara (born 1969), Irish actor
- Peter O'Meara (rugby union), CEO of the Western Force rugby union team
- Richard O'Meara, United States Brigadier General
- Ryan O'Meara (figure skater) (born 1984), American ice dancer
- Seán O'Meara (songwriter), Irish songwriter
- Seán O'Meara (Offaly hurler) (fl. 1980–1981), Irish hurler
- Seán O'Meara (Tipperary hurler) (1951–2010), Irish hurler
- Shane O'Meara (born 1992), Irish actor
- Stephen O'Meara (1854–1918), Canadian-born American journalist and political figure
- Stephen James O'Meara (born 1956), American astronomer
- Walter O'Meara (1897–1989), American author

== Meara ==
- Anne Meara (1929–2015), American actress and comedian

== O'Mara ==
- James O'Mara (1873–1948), Irish businessman and politician
- Jared O'Mara (born 1981), British politician
- Jason O'Mara (born 1972), Irish-American actor
- Joseph O'Mara (1864–1927), Irish opera singer
- Kate O'Mara (1939–2014), English actress and writer

== Mara ==
- Jack Mara (1908–1965), co-owner of the New York Giants
- John Mara (born 1954), president, CEO, and co-owner of the New York Giants
- Kate Mara (born 1983), American actress and fashion model
- Rooney Mara (born 1985), American actress and fashion designer
- Tim Mara (1887–1959), founder and administrator of the New York Giants and grandparent of Timothy J. Mara
- Timothy J. Mara (c. 1935 – 1995), American businessman, part owner of the New York Giants football team, and grandchild of Tim Mara
- Wellington Mara (1916–2005), co-owner of the New York Giants and child of Tim Mara

== See also ==
- Meara (disambiguation)
