= Seán O'Meara =

Seán O'Meara may refer to:

- Seán O'Meara (Offaly hurler) (fl. 1980–1981), Irish hurler
- Seán O'Meara (Tipperary hurler) (1951–2010), Irish hurler
- Seán O'Meara (songwriter), writer of 1985 song "Grace"
