= List of number-one singles of 1966 (Ireland) =

This is a list of singles which topped the Irish Singles Chart in 1966.

Note that prior to 1992, the Irish singles chart was compiled from trade shipments from the labels to record stores, rather than on consumer sales.

Issue date	Song	Artist	Ref.
3 January	"Day Tripper"	The Beatles	
10 January	"Day Tripper"	The Beatles	
17 January	"Day Tripper"	The Beatles	
24 January	"Lovely Leitrim"	Larry Cunningham	
31 January	"Lovely Leitrim"	Larry Cunningham	
7 February	"Old Man Trouble"	Doc Carroll and the Royal Blues	
14 February	"Old Man Trouble"	Doc Carroll and the Royal Blues	
21 February	"These Boots Are Made for Walkin'"	Nancy Sinatra	
28 February	"Come Back To Stay"	Dickie Rock	
7 March	"Come Back To Stay"	Dickie Rock	
14 March	"Come Back To Stay"	Dickie Rock	
21 March	"Come Back To Stay"	Dickie Rock	
28 March	"The Sea Around Us"	The Ludlows	
4 April	"The Sea Around Us"	The Ludlows	
11 April	"The Sea Around Us"	The Ludlows	
18 April	"The Sea Around Us"	The Ludlows	
25 April	"Black and Tan Gun"	The Johnny Flynn Showband with Pat Smith	
2 May	"Black and Tan Gun"	The Johnny Flynn Showband with Pat Smith	
9 May	"Pretty Flamingo"	Manfred Mann	
16 May	"Pretty Flamingo"	Manfred Mann	
23 May	"Pretty Flamingo"	Manfred Mann	
30 May	"Pretty Flamingo"	Manfred Mann	
6 June	"Strangers in the Night"	Frank Sinatra	
13 June	"Strangers in the Night"	Frank Sinatra	
20 June	"Paperback Writer"	The Beatles	
27 June	"Paperback Writer"	The Beatles	
4 July	"Paperback Writer"	The Beatles	
11 July	"Paperback Writer"	The Beatles	
18 July	"Sunny Afternoon"	The Kinks	
25 July	"More Than Yesterday"	Gregory and the Cadets	
1 August	"More Than Yesterday"	Gregory and the Cadets	
8 August	"More Than Yesterday"	Gregory and the Cadets	
15 August	"The Travelling People"	The Johnstons	
22 August	"Yellow Submarine"	The Beatles	
29 August	"Yellow Submarine"	The Beatles	
5 September	"Pretty Brown Eyes"	Joe Dolan	
12 September	"Pretty Brown Eyes"	Joe Dolan	
19 September	"Pretty Brown Eyes"	Joe Dolan	
26 September	"The Merry Ploughboy (Off To Dublin In The Green)"	Dermot O'Brien	
3 October	"The Merry Ploughboy (Off To Dublin In The Green)"	Dermot O'Brien	
10 October	"The Merry Ploughboy (Off To Dublin In The Green)"	Dermot O'Brien	
17 October	"The Merry Ploughboy (Off To Dublin In The Green)"	Dermot O'Brien	
24 October	"The Merry Ploughboy (Off To Dublin In The Green)"	Dermot O'Brien	
31 October	"The Merry Ploughboy (Off To Dublin In The Green)"	Dermot O'Brien	
7 November	"Somewhere My Love"	Charlie Matthews & the Royal Showband	
14 November	"Mursheen Durkin"	Johnny McEvoy	
21 November	"Mursheen Durkin"	Johnny McEvoy	
28 November	"Mursheen Durkin"	Johnny McEvoy	
5 December	"Green, Green Grass of Home"	Tom Jones	
12 December	"Green, Green Grass of Home"	Tom Jones	
19 December	"Green, Green Grass of Home"	Tom Jones	
26 December	"Green, Green Grass of Home"	Tom Jones	

== See also ==
- 1966 in music
- Irish Singles Chart
- List of artists who reached number one in Ireland
