= Frank O'Meara =

Irish artist (1853–1888)

- Frank O'Meara, John Singer Sargent, 1876
- Born: Francis Joseph O'Meara; 30 March 1853; Carlow, Ireland
- Died: 15 October 1888 (aged 35); Carlow
- Resting place: Bennekerry, Carlow
- Known for: Impressionist painting
- Movement: Impressionism

Francis Joseph O'Meara (30 March 1853 – 15 October 1888) was an Irish artist known for his Impressionist landscape painting.

== Life ==
Frank O'Meara was born in Carlow 30 March 1853, to Thomas and Sarah O'Meara (née Isbourne). The youngest of seven children, his father was a medical doctor, and his grandfather Dr Barry Edward O'Meara was Napoleon's physician on St. Helena. The family lived at 37 Dublin Street, Carlow, and O'Meara likely attended St. Mary's Knockbeg College. From 1869 to 1871 O'Meara lived in Dublin, when he may have continued his education or received private art lessons. An early sketchbook that survives from this time shows landscape studies from around County Carlow, as well as studies of churches and animals. Two of O'Meara's siblings died young, and his mother died in 1873. It is following this, that he moved to Paris, where his cousin Kathleen O'Meara was a writer and correspondent for The Tablet.

== Artistic career ==
O'Meara became one of the first students of Carolus Duran at 81 Boulevard Montparnasse, working alongside English, French and American students including John Singer Sargent. Duran was heavily influenced by Diego Velázquez, though there is little evidence of this influence in O'Meara's work. Whilst studying and socialising in Paris, fellow students did notice a predilection towards moodiness and introspection in his personality, which is reflected in his work. Some have speculated that it was the loss of his two siblings and mother at a young age that cast this sense of melancholy over O'Meara's character.

In 1875, he visited the artists colonies, firstly in Barbizon, and then Grez-sur-Loing where he settled and eventually befriended Robert Louis Stevenson. O'Meara stayed in Grez-sur-Loing for almost 11 years, with brief periods away during the winter or for exhibitions. He favoured painting en plein air, preferring low grey evening light. During the spring of 1876 Fanny Osbourne, and her daughter Isobel arrived at Grez. The Osbournes and O'Meara developed a friendship, with the pair visiting galleries and museums in Paris, and painting together. When the Osbournes left to return to California in 1878, O'Meara presented a portrait of himself painted by John Singer Sargent to Isobel, with whom he is believed to have fallen in love. Whilst many of his friends left Grez, O'Meara stayed, living at Hôtel Chevillon and continuing to paint.

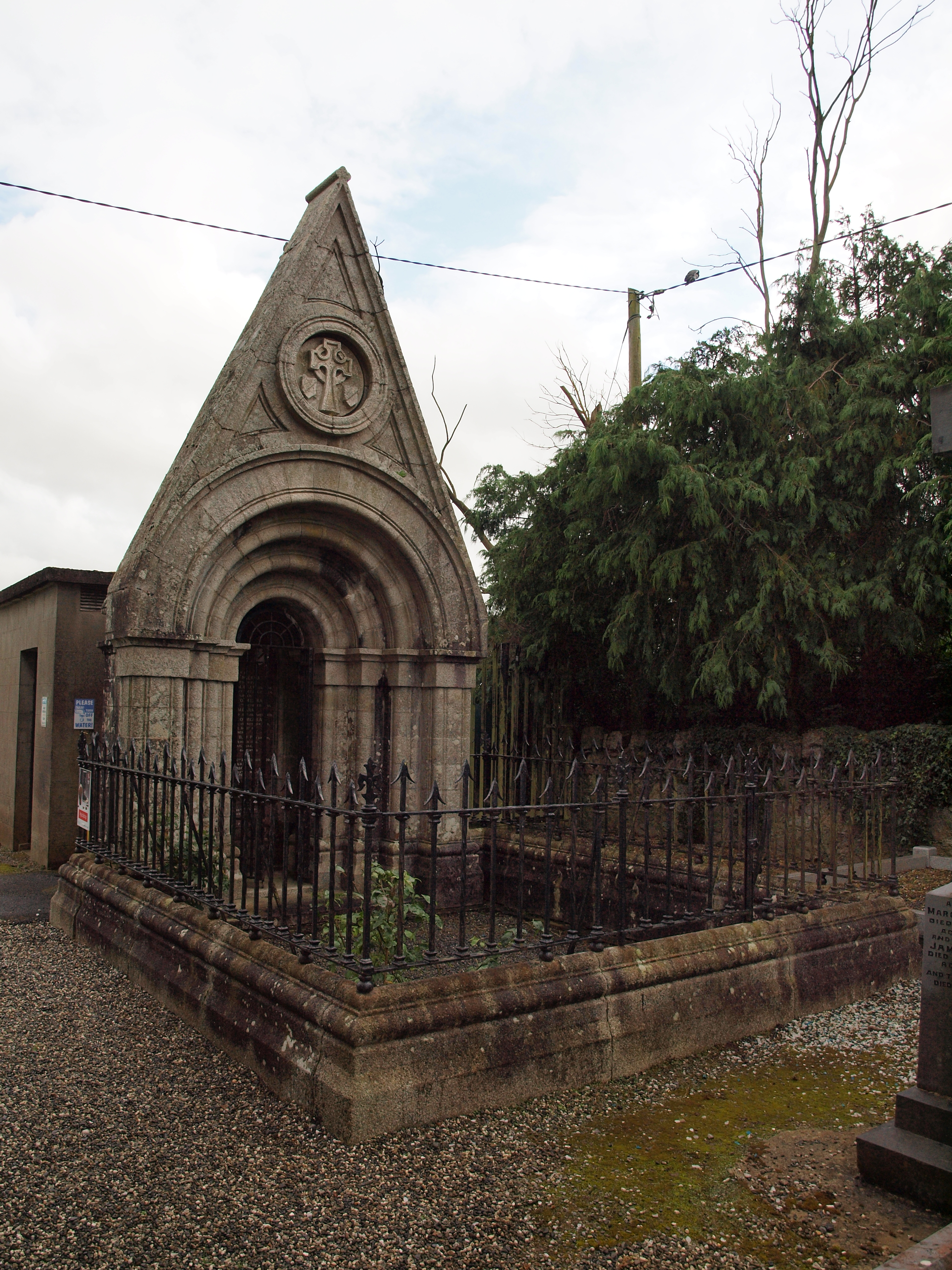
The burial place of O'Meara at the O'Meara Monument, Bennekerry, County Carlow

There are a few characteristic elements of O'Meara's work: figures of lone women, often near water with bare autumnal trees, in evening light. There is a sense of melancholia in his work which some have attributed to his personal misfortune: his ill-health, living in near poverty, and two failed love affairs. O'Meara was a popular companion amongst the English-speaking painters, including John Lavery, William Stott and Carl Larsson. Stott's work bears the strongest influence from O'Meara, though Lavery noted that of all the artists in Grez, O'Meara influenced him the most. O'Meara exhibited Rêverie in "A collection of pictures by British artists from the Paris salon" at the Fine Art Society in London in July 1882, and some more work was shown at the Liverpool Autumn Exhibition in 1883 and at the Royal Glasgow Institute of the Fine Arts in 1884, 1885 and 1887. O'Meara was a very slow painter, producing an average of just 3 pictures a year.

O'Meara returned to Carlow in the spring of 1888 and died on 15 October that year, aged thirty-five, having suffered from malaria for a number of years. He is regarded as never having reached his full potential as an artist due to his long illness and premature death. In 1879, O'Meara featured in one Royal Hibernian Academy exhibition with the painting The old old story. His father then lent one of his paintings to the Dublin Arts Club in 1889. His work was included in The peasant in nineteenth-century French artn The Douglas Hyde Gallery, Dublin, in 1983, The Irish impressionists at the National Gallery of Ireland in 1984 and Ulster Museum in 1985, and Frank O'Meara and his contemporaries Dublin City Gallery The Hugh Lane, Crawford Art Gallery, Cork, and Ulster Museum in 1989. Five of his works hang at the Hugh Lane Gallery of Modern Art, in Dublin. Another can be viewed at the Ulster Museum, Belfast. O'Meara's work has been described as being rediscovered in the late 1990s, with the prices of his paintings at auction reaching unforeseen prices. In May 1999, at a Christie's auction in London, Reverie sold for over ten times the estimate, at £496,500 sterling.

== Gallery ==
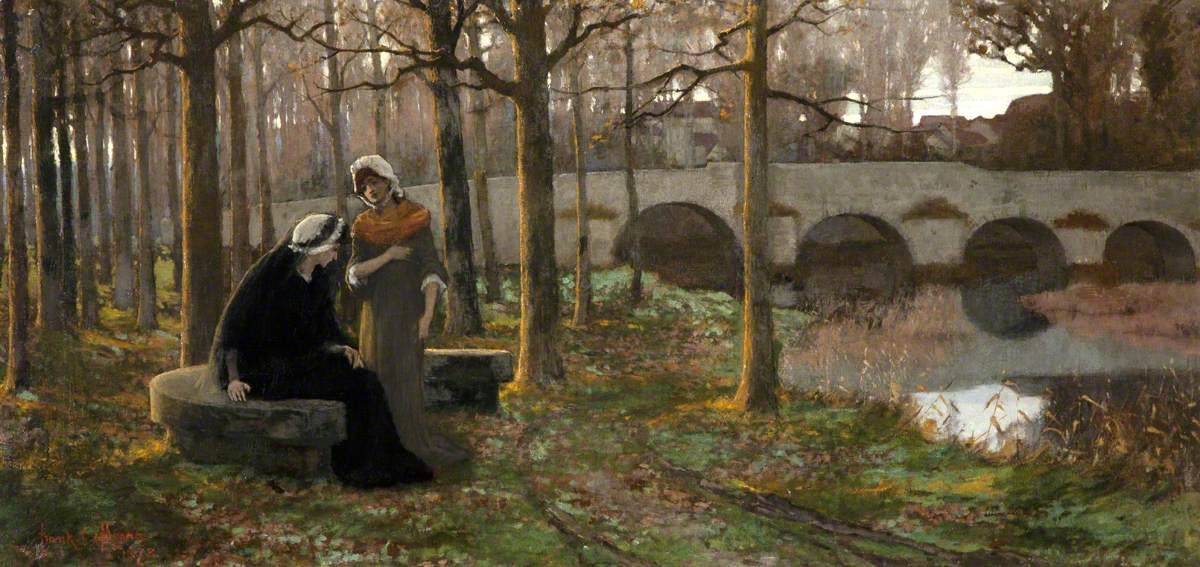
Autumnal Sorrows, 1878

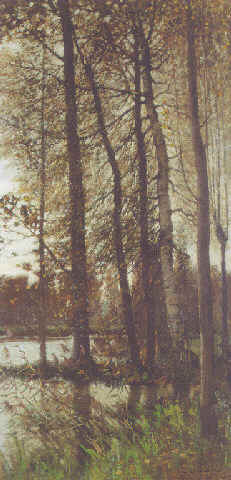
Autumnal greys (Forest of Fontainbleau), 1880

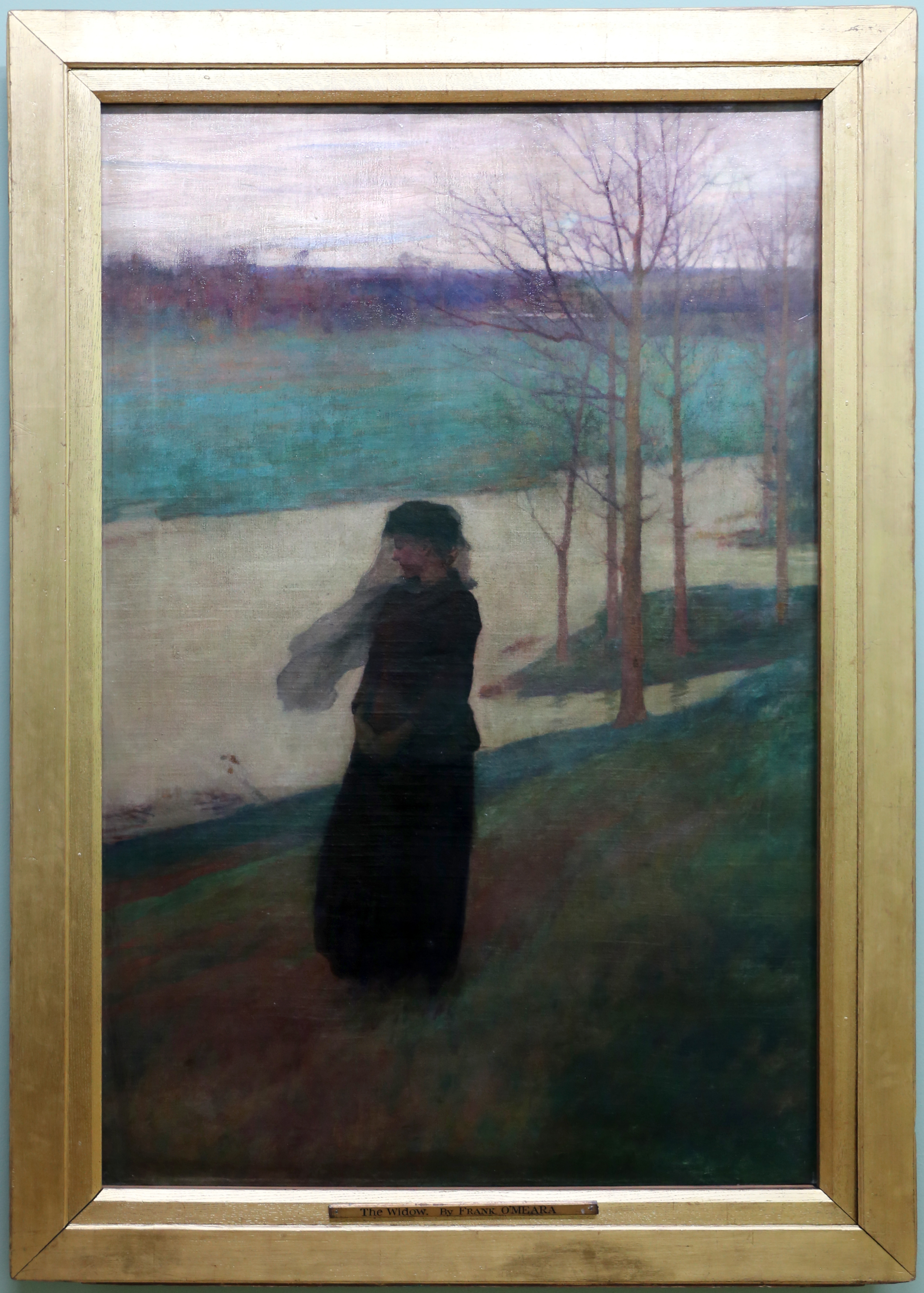
La Vedova, 1882

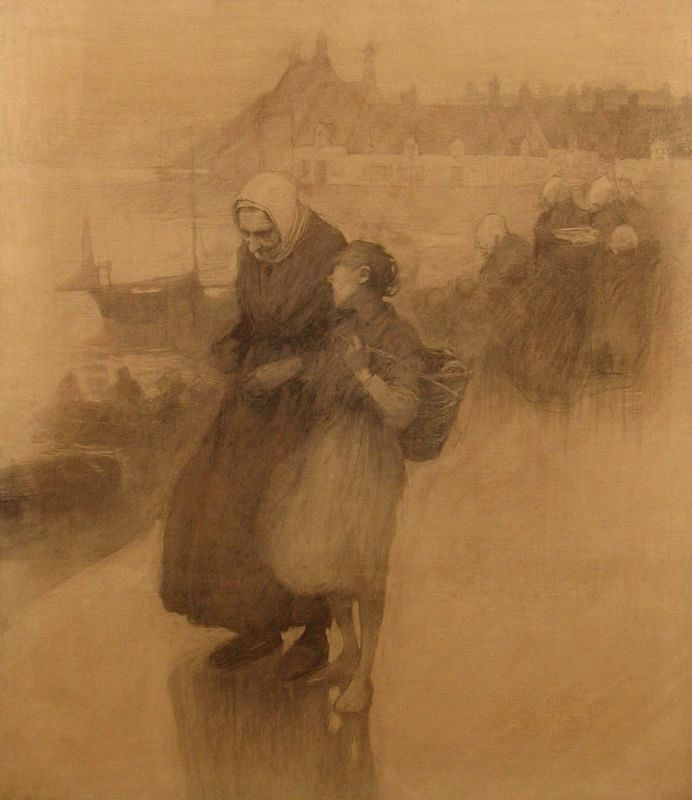
On the quays, charcoal on canvas, 1888

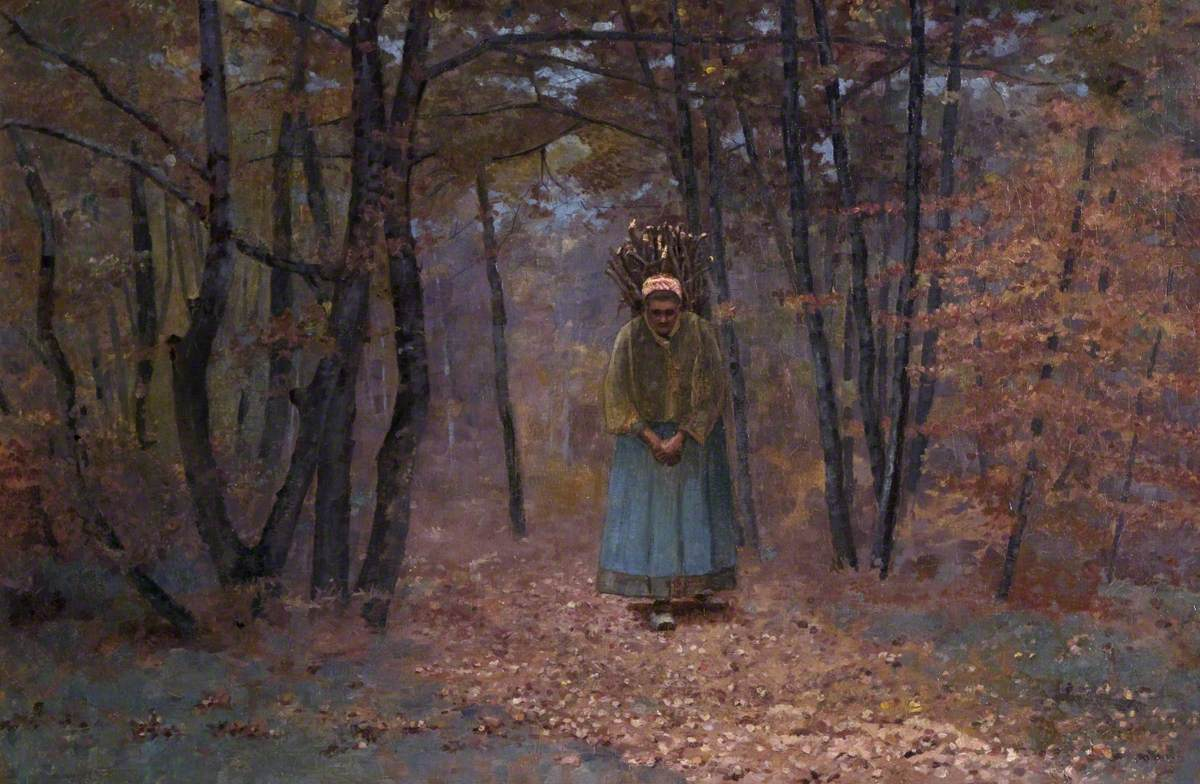
Old Woman Gathering Faggots
