= White Shadows =

White Shadows may refer to:

- White Shadows (song), a song by Coldplay
- White Shadows (film), a 1951 West German drama film
- White Shadows, 2023 short story collection by Seán O'Meara (songwriter)
