= Kathleen O'Meara =

Kathleen O'Meara may refer to:

- Kathleen O'Meara (writer) (1839–1888), Irish-French writer
- Kathleen O'Meara (politician) (born 1960), Irish politician
