= The Ludlows =

- Origin: Ireland
- Genres: Irish folk
- Years active: 1964–1967
- Labels: Pye
- Members: Jim McCann; Paddy Roche; Margaret O'Brien; Gerry Cairns; Sean Loughran

The Ludlows were a popular Irish folk band in the 1960s. Their name was derived from Woody Guthrie's song "Ludlow Massacre", concerning a fatal miners' labour dispute in Ludlow, Colorado, in 1914.

== History ==
Formed in 1964, and originally called the Ludlows Ballad Group, then the Ludlow Trio, they consisted of Sean Loughran, from Carrick-on-Suir, Paddy Roche and Margaret O'Brien. Margaret O'Brien had been a member of the Radio Éireann Choral Society, where she preferred to sing in Irish. Loughran had spent some years in Scotland where he had absorbed Scottish folk music. The following year Dubliner Jim McCann took the place of Paddy Roche.

In July 1965 they had a hit with "The Butcher Boy" (a variation of "Died for Love") and also recorded "Yesterday's Dream". By this time they were touring Ireland and Britain and appearing on TV and radio. In 1966 they were the first Irish folk group to have a no. 1 hit, which was Dominic Behan's "The Sea Around Us", which remained at the top spot for four weeks. They followed this up with a satirical composition of their own, "Johnny Lad". In that year they also performed two songs for the Irish National Song Contest, one of which, "The Wind Through the Rafters" came second and entered the Irish hit parade. They recorded an album, The Wind and the Sea, with Pye Records.

By 1967 Gerry Cairns had replaced Sean Loughran. The group broke up at the end of 1967. Margaret O'Brien and Jim McCann embarked on solo careers. McCann later joined The Dubliners. Gerry Cairns went to Scotland.

== See also ==
- Number-one singles of 1966 (Ireland)
