= Old Man Trouble =

1964 song by Fats Domino

Song by Fats Domino

from the album Fats on Fire
- Released: 1964
- Recorded: 10 January 1964
- Studio: Sam Phillips Studio, 319 7th Avenue North, Nashville
- Genre: Rock and roll
- Length: 1:55
- Label: ABC-Paramount
- Songwriter: Jerry Smith

"Old Man Trouble" is 1964 rock and roll song written by Jerry Smith and recorded by Fats Domino for his 1964 album Fats on Fire.

== Doc Carroll cover ==
"Old Man Trouble"

Single by Doc Carroll and the Royal Blues
- B-side: "You Never Know What You're Missing"
- Released: December 1965
- Recorded: 1965
- Genre: rock and roll; showband
- Length: 1:52
- Label: Parlophone
- Songwriter: Jerry D. Smith

Doc Carroll and the Royal Blues singles chronology
"Old Man Trouble" (1965)	"Far Away from You" (1966)

A cover version by Irish showband singer Doc Carroll reached #1 in the Irish Singles Chart, staying there for two weeks in 1966. At the time, it was claimed that County Mayo people bought up the record in large quantities so that the Royal Blues would be the first West of Ireland act to reach number one. It allowed Carroll to displace Shay O'Hara as lead vocalist with the Royal Blues showband, and he went on to have a long and successful career in Ireland.

== See also ==
- List of number-one singles of 1966 (Ireland)
