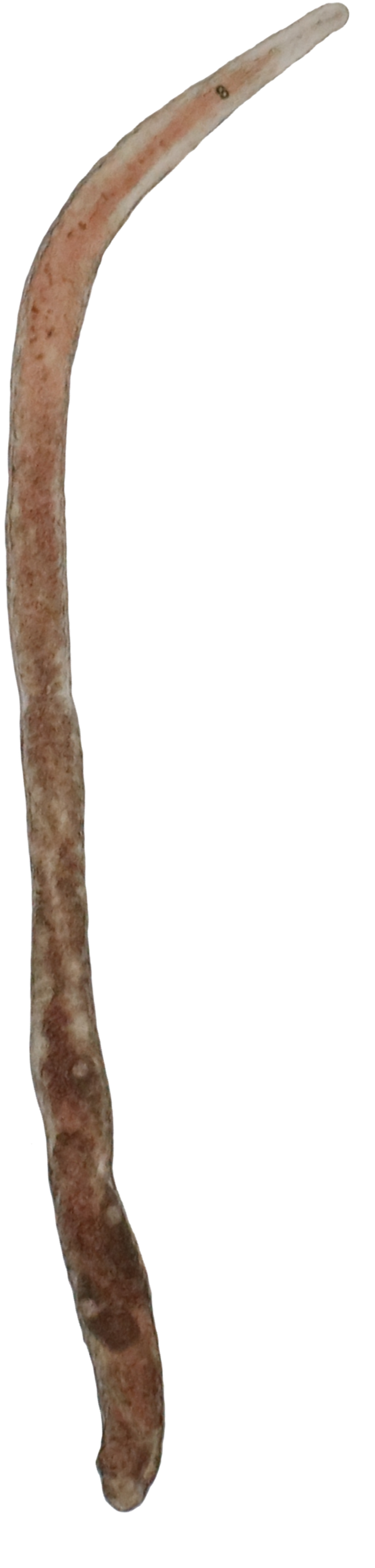
- Sterreria rubra

Scientific classification
- Kingdom: Animalia
- Phylum: Xenacoelomorpha
- Class: Nemertodermatida
- Family: Nemertodermatidae
- Genus: Sterreria; Lundin, 2000

= Sterreria =

Genus of acoelomorphs

Sterreria is a genus of acoelomorphs belonging to the family Nemertodermatidae.

The species of this genus are found in Northern Europe.

Species:

- Sterreria boucheti Meyer-Wachsmuth, Curini Galletti & Jondelius, 2014
- Sterreria lundini Meyer-Wachsmuth, Curini Galletti & Jondelius, 2014
- Sterreria martindalei Meyer-Wachsmuth, Curini Galletti & Jondelius, 2014
- Sterreria monolithes Meyer-Wachsmuth, Curini Galletti & Jondelius, 2014
- Sterreria papuensis Meyer-Wachsmuth, Curini Galletti & Jondelius, 2014
- Sterreria psammicola (Sterrer, 1970)
- Sterreria rubra (Faubel, 1976)
- Sterreria variabilis Meyer-Wachsmuth, Curini Galletti & Jondelius, 2014
- Sterreria ylvae Meyer-Wachsmuth, Curini Galletti & Jondelius, 2014
