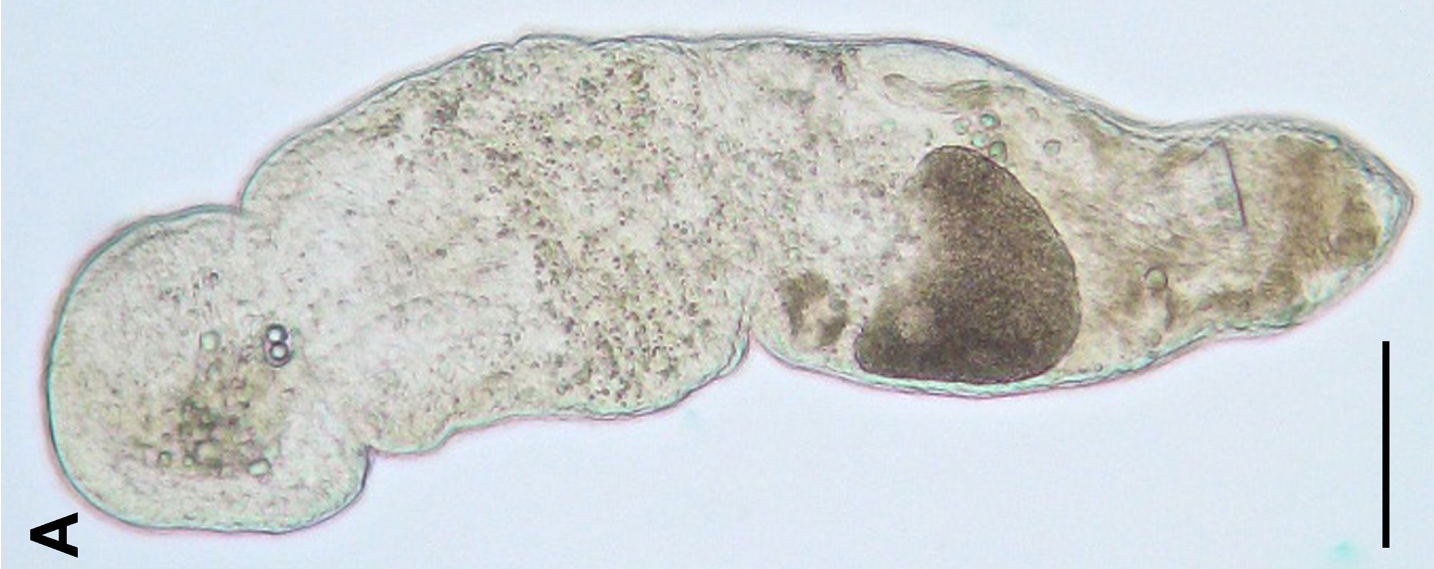

Scientific classification
- Domain: Eukaryota
- Kingdom: Animalia
- Phylum: Xenacoelomorpha
- Class: Nemertodermatida
- Family: Ascopariidae
- Genus: Flagellophora; Faubel & Dörjes, 1978
- Species: F. apelti

Binomial name
- Flagellophora apelti Faubel & Dorjes, 1978

= Flagellophora =

Genus of acoelomorphs

Flagellophora is a monotypic genus of nemertodermatidans belonging to the family Ascopariidae. The only species is Flagellophora apelti.

The species is found in Northern Europe.
