= Ascoparia =

Scientific classification
- Kingdom: Animalia
- Phylum: Xenacoelomorpha
- Class: Nemertodermatida
- Family: Ascopariidae
- Genus: Ascoparia; Sterrer, 1998

Genus of acoelomorphs

Ascoparia is a genus of nemertodermatidans belonging to the family Ascopariidae.

The genus has a cosmopolitan distribution.

Species:

- Ascoparia neglecta Sterrer, 1998
- Ascoparia secunda Sterrer, 1998
