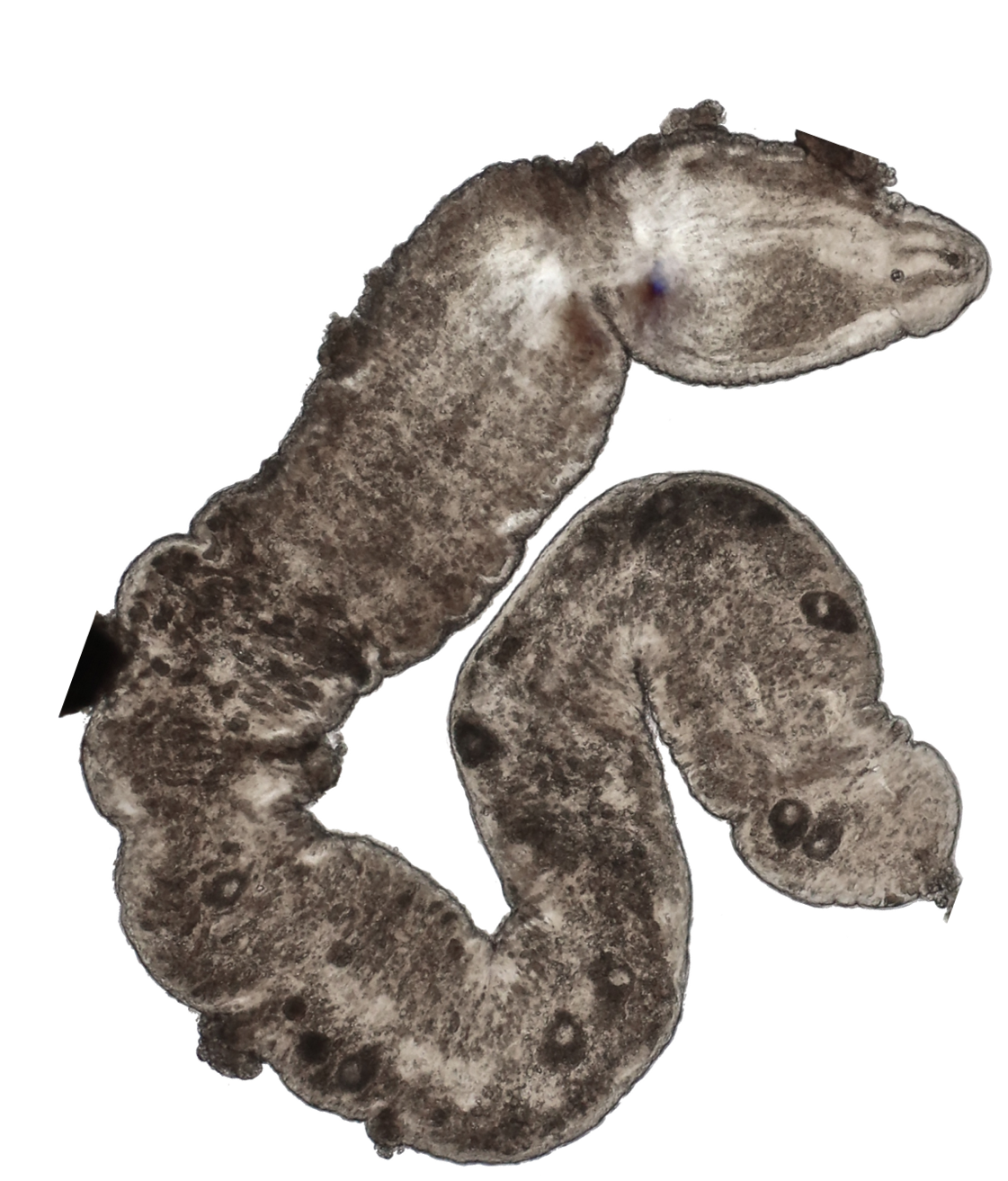
- Nemertinoides wolfgangi

Scientific classification
- Kingdom: Animalia
- Phylum: Xenacoelomorpha
- Class: Nemertodermatida
- Family: Nemertodermatidae
- Genus: Nemertinoides; Riser, 1987

= Nemertinoides =

Genus of acoelomorphs

Nemertinoides is a genus of acoelomorphs belonging to the family Nemertodermatidae.

The species of this genus are found in North America and near Antarctica.

Species:

- Nemertinoides elongatus Riser, 1987
- Nemertinoides glandulosum Meyer-Wachsmuth, Curini Galletti & Jondelius, 2014
- Nemertinoides wolfgangi Meyer-Wachsmuth, Curini Galletti & Jondelius, 2014
