= Edmund O'Meara =

Irish physiologist (1614–1681)

Edmund O'Meara (Irish: Éamonn Ó Meadhra, also known as Edmund Meara; 1614–1681) was an Irish physiologist and one of the last prominent champions of the medical ideas of Galen. Son of Dermod O'Meara who was a physician, poet and author. O'Meara is remembered today for his criticism of vivisection, stating that the agony suffered by lab animals distorted the research results, using this as a basis to reject William Harvey's ideas about the circulatory system and defend the earlier theories of Galen.

O'Meara wrote an epitaph for Malachy Ó Caollaidhe, but was unable to locate his grave.

== See also ==
- Barry Edward O'Meara, surgeon, 1786–1836.
- Kathleen O'Meara, catholic writer, 1839–1888.
