= Nemertoderma =

Scientific classification
- Kingdom: Animalia
- Phylum: Xenacoelomorpha
- Class: Nemertodermatida
- Family: Nemertodermatidae
- Genus: Nemertoderma; Steinböck, 1930

Genus of acoelomorphs

Nemertoderma is a genus of worms belonging to the family Nemertodermatidae.

The species of this genus are found in Europe.

Species:

- Nemertoderma bathycola Steinböck, 1930
- Nemertoderma westbladi (Westblad, 1937)
