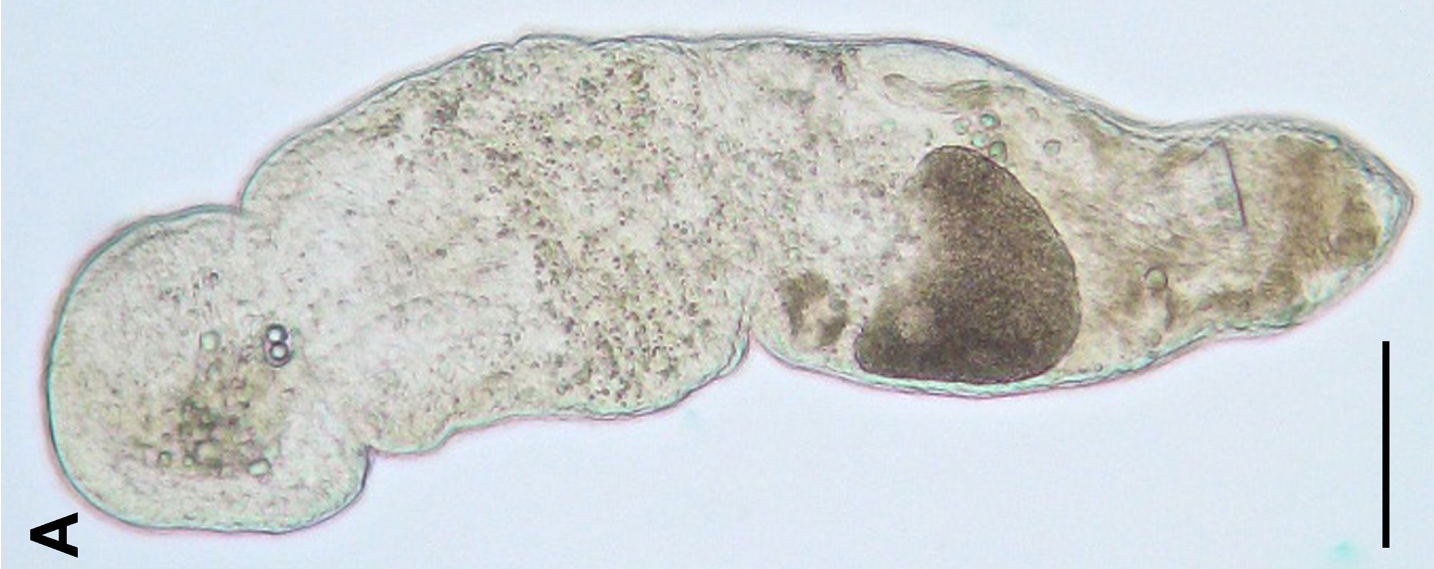
- Flagellophora spp.

Scientific classification
- Kingdom: Animalia
- Phylum: Xenacoelomorpha
- Class: Nemertodermatida
- Family: Ascopariidae; Sterrer, 1998

Genera
- Ascoparia; Flagellophora

= Ascopariidae =

Family of acoelomorphs

Ascopariidae is a family of nemertodermatid worms.

== Genera ==
=== Ascoparia ===
Contains the following species:

- Ascoparia neglecta Sterrer, 1998
- Ascoparia secunda Sterrer, 1998

=== Flagellophora ===
Contains the following species:

- Flagellophora apelti Faubel & Dorjes, 1978
