= Jim McCann (musician) =

Irish musician (1944–2015)

- McCann, 2015

Background information
- Born: 26 October 1944
- Origin: Dublin, Ireland
- Died: 5 March 2015 (aged 70)
- Genres: Folk
- Occupation: Musician
- Instruments: Vocals; guitar
- Years active: 1964–2015
- Formerly of: The Dubliners; The Ludlows

James McCann (26 October 1944 – 5 March 2015) was an Irish entertainer and folk musician. Although a solo artist for most of his career, McCann was a member of the folk group The Dubliners from 1974 until 1979, then later appearing with them in their 2002 reunion and their 50th anniversary tour in 2012.

== Early life ==
As a young man, McCann attended University College Dublin as a student of medicine.

== Career ==
=== Early work ===
McCann became interested in folk music during a summer holiday in Birmingham in 1964. He began to perform in folk clubs in the area, and, upon his return to Dublin, he joined a group called the Ludlow Trio in 1965. In the following year, the Ludlow Trio had a hit with their recording of Dominic Behan's "The Sea Around Us", which reached number one in the Irish charts.

The Ludlow Trio broke up in the following year, and McCann began a solo career, releasing an album, McCann, and making several appearances on several folk programmes for Telefis Éireann. A big hit for him came in 1986 with the song "Grace", about Grace Gifford, written by Seán O'Méara.

Amongst other pursuits, he spent the next few years involving himself in theatrical productions (starting with Maureen Potter's "Gaels of Laughter" in 1968), and he toured throughout Ireland and Britain. He released a second album, McCanned, made a television special called Reflections of Jim McCann, and then hosted a series called The McCann Man.

=== The Dubliners ===
It was on The McCann Man that he met fellow folk artist, Luke Kelly of The Dubliners. During this appearance, Kelly did his only televised performance of the Phil Coulter song "Scorn Not His Simplicity", a song that he chose to perform sparingly out of respect to the subject matter (Coulter's intellectually disabled son).

McCann subsequently performed alongside Kelly in the original cast of Jesus Christ Superstar in 1973, in the role of Peter. In April 1974 Kelly asked McCann to join The Dubliners temporarily, to replace Ciarán Bourke during a period of illness. However, he became a permanent member soon afterwards, when Ronnie Drew left the group to pursue a solo career. McCann remained with The Dubliners until the end of 1979, during which he toured incessantly, also recording several albums with the group.

He did rejoin The Dubliners in 2002 for their 40th anniversary tour and later at Vicar Street in 2012 for their 50th.

=== Later work ===
McCann continued to perform, tour, and record music as a solo artist, appearing on many television shows (particularly on RTÉ) and achieving success with albums such as From Clare to Here and singles such as "Grace" which was in the Irish charts for 33 weeks from 1 April 1986 and reached number 2 position.

He rejoined the Dubliners in 2002 for their 40th anniversary album, but during the subsequent tour was diagnosed with throat cancer. Although treatment for the illness was successful, the damage to his voice left him unable to sing. However, he still collaborated with the Dubliners by taking the photographs for them, appearing as a compère in their concerts, and sometimes playing the guitar. During the Dubliners' last concert in December 2012, he performed with them as a guitarist.

== Death ==
McCann's death was announced by his family on 5 March 2015. He had been battling throat cancer for some time.

== Discography ==
Solo

- McCann (1967)
- McCanned (1972)
- Live at the National Stadium (1982)
- Jim McCann (1980)
- Grace & Other Irish Love Songs (1996)
- From Tara to Here (1999) (Gold) Recorded and released on Irish record label Celtic Collections
- Greatest Hits (1999)
- The Collection (2001)
- Live at the Skagen Festival (2002)
- By Request (2003) Recorded and released on Irish record label Celtic Collections
- Ireland's Greatest Love Songs (2003)
- Seems Like a Long Time: A Jim McCann Retrospective (2004)
- Live 2008 (2008)
- The Best of Jim McCann (2015)

Compilations (with various artists)

- Ireland's Greatest Hits (1987)
- Legends of Irish Folk (2014)

== Filmography ==
- Reflections of Jim McCann – TV special
- The McCann Man – TV series
- Festival Folk – TV special featuring Jim, Matt Manning and English Steve.
- My Ireland – TV special
- McCann & McTell – TV special

== Theatre ==
- Gaels of Laughter (1968)
- Jesus Christ Superstar (1973) – Peter
- Joseph and the Amazing Technicolour Dreamcoat – Narrator

== Bibliography ==
- Luke Kelly: a Memoir, Des Geraghty, ISBN 1-85594-090-6
- "Jim McCann". itsthedubliners.com. Archived from the original on 11 March 2016.
