= The Sea Around Us (song) =

Irish folk song

Single by The Ludlows

from the album The Wind and the Sea
- B-side: "The Butcher Boy"
- Released: February 11, 1966
- Genre: Irish folk
- Length: 3:04
- Label: Pye
- Songwriter: Dominic Behan

"The Sea Around Us" is an Irish folk song written by Dominic Behan. A version recorded by The Ludlows reached number one in the Irish Singles Chart in 1966. Other versions have been recorded by Dermot O'Brien, The Dubliners, Patsy Watchorn and Ron Kavana.

Brendan Behan, Dominic's older brother, depicts himself twice singing a slightly different version of the chorus, in the autobiographical novel Borstal Boy, set in the early 1940s in England, when Dominic would have been twelve or thirteen.

A parody of the song, entitled "Dollymount Strand" ("Meself and the architect's daughter") was written by Shay Healy and recorded by Paddy Reilly in 1971.
