= Meara (name) =

Meara is a feminine given name and a surname, similar to Ó Meadhra.

== List of people with the given name ==
- Meara Conway, Canadian politician

== List of people with the surname ==
- Anne Meara (1929–2015), American comedian and actress
- David Meara (born 1947), British Anglican priest
- James Meara (born 1972), British former footballer
- Ryan Meara (born 1990), American soccer player

== See also ==
- Meara (disambiguation)
