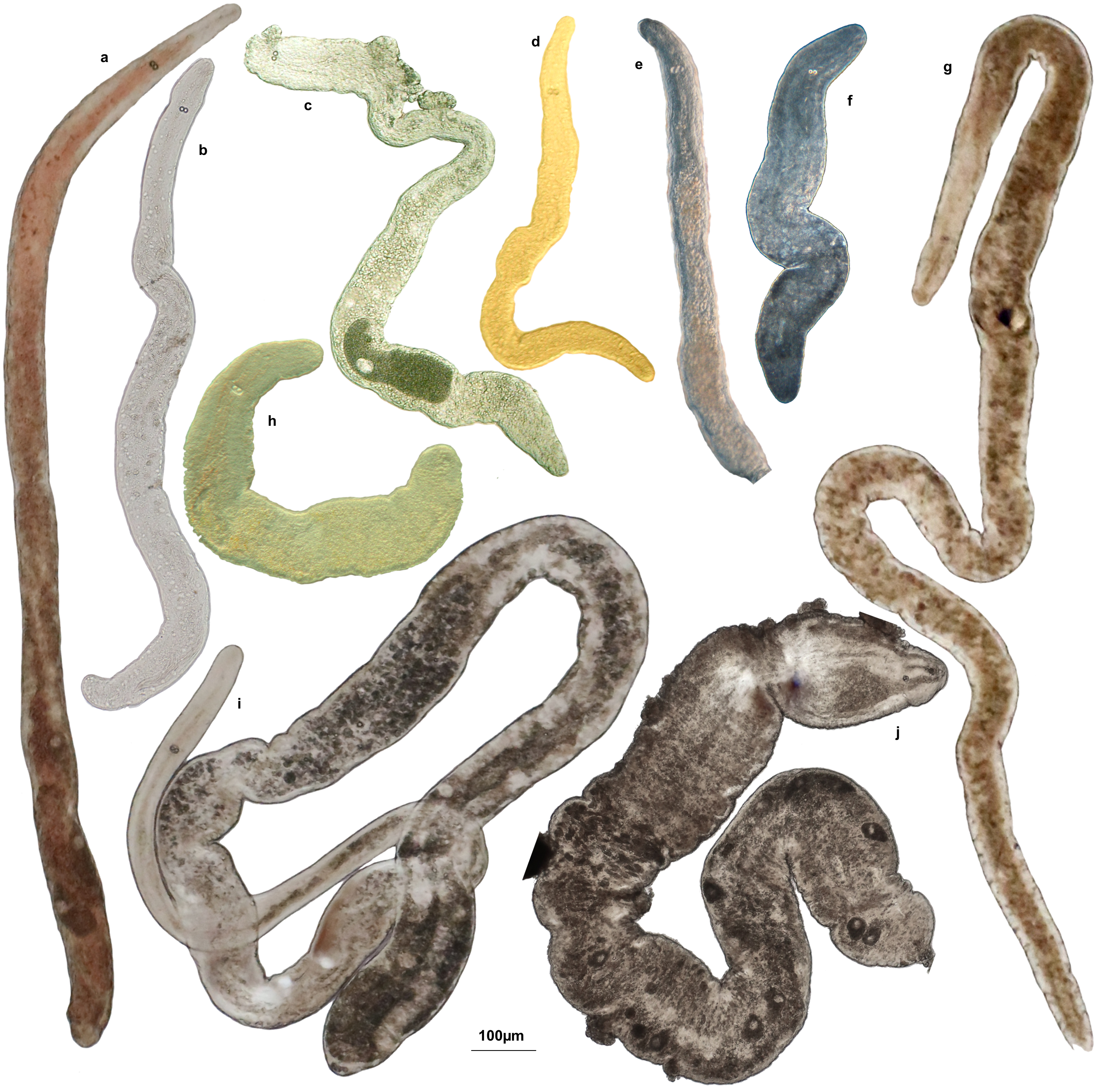

Scientific classification
- Kingdom: Animalia
- Phylum: Xenacoelomorpha
- Subphylum: Acoelomorpha
- Class: Nemertodermatida; Karling, 1940

= Nemertodermatida =

Class of acoelomorphs

Nemertodermatida is a class of Xenacoelomorpha, comprising 18 species of millimetre-sized turbellariform, mostly interstitial worms.

== Taxonomy ==
The order Nemertodermatida contains two families with 6 genera. The high level of cryptic diversity in this meiofauna group however implies that the number of nemertodermatid taxa may be underestimated.

=== Ascopariidae ===
The family Ascopariidae Sterrer, 1998 contains two genera.

- Ascoparia Sterrer, 1998
- Flagellophora Faubel & Dorjes, 1978

There are 3 species in the family Ascopariidae.

| Name (Note: A binomial authority in parentheses indicates that the species was originally described in a different genus.) | Image | Distribution | Description |
|---|---|---|---|
| Ascoparia neglecta Sterrer, 1998 | | | |
| Ascoparia secunda Sterrer, 1998 | | | |
| Flagellophora apelti Faubel & Dorjes, 1978 | | | |

=== Nemertodermatidae ===
The family Nemertodermatidae Steinböck, 1930 contains four genera.

- Meara
- Nemertinoides
- Nemertoderma
- Sterreria

There are 15 species in the family Nemertodermatidae.

| Name | Image | Distribution | Description |
|---|---|---|---|
| Meara stichopi Westblad, 1949 | | | |
| Nemertinoides elongatus Riser, 1987 | | | |
| Nemertinoides glandulosum Meyer-Wachsmuth, Curini Galletti & Jondelius, 2014 | | | |
| Nemertinoides wolfgangi Meyer-Wachsmuth, Curini Galletti & Jondelius, 2014 | | | |
| Nemertoderma bathycola Steinböck, 1930 | | | |
| Nemertoderma westbladi (Westblad, 1937) Steinbock, 1938 | | | |
| Sterreria boucheti Meyer-Wachsmuth, Curini Galletti & Jondelius, 2014 | | | |
| Sterreria lundini Meyer-Wachsmuth, Curini Galletti & Jondelius, 2014 | | | |
| Sterreria martindalei Meyer-Wachsmuth, Curini Galletti & Jondelius, 2014 | | | |
| Sterreria monolithes Meyer-Wachsmuth, Curini Galletti & Jondelius, 2014 | | | |
| Sterreria papuensis Meyer-Wachsmuth, Curini Galletti & Jondelius, 2014 | | | |
| Sterreria psammicola (Sterrer, 1970) | | | |
| Sterreria rubra (Faubel, 1976) | | | |
| Sterreria variabilis Meyer-Wachsmuth, Curini Galletti & Jondelius, 2014 | | | |
| Sterreria ylvae Meyer-Wachsmuth, Curini Galletti & Jondelius, 2014 | | | |
