= Grace (Jim McCann song) =

Irish song about Grace Gifford, written 1985

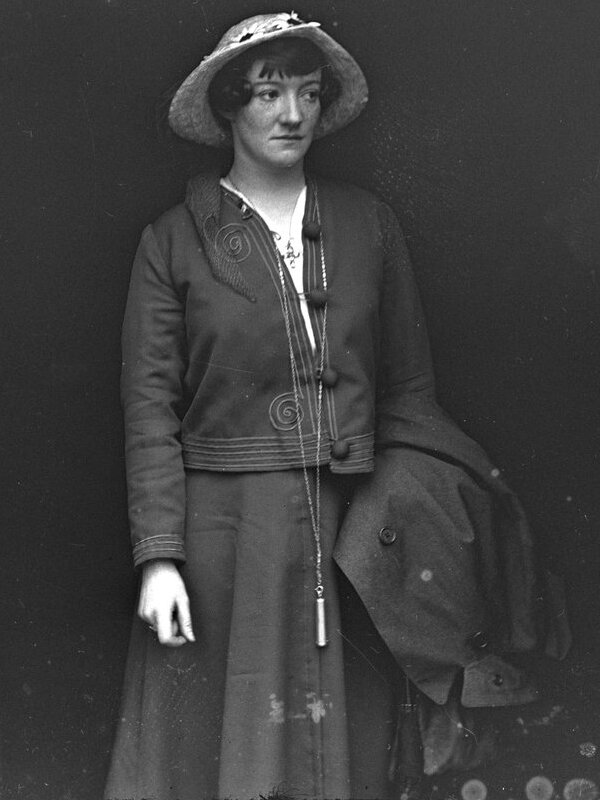
Grace Gifford, subject of the song, outside Kilmainham Jail on 2 May 1916, before her marriage on 3 May and her husband's death on 4 May

"Grace" is an Irish song written in 1985 by Frank O'Meara (melody) and Seán O'Meara (lyrics). It tells the story of Grace Gifford's marriage to Joseph Plunkett in Kilmainham Jail, hours before his execution in 1916. It was released as a single by Jim McCann and reached number 2 in the Irish charts, staying in the charts for 33 weeks from 1 April 1986.

Jim McCann described it as:

A good new song about an old subject.

Former politician Donie Cassidy, who owns the rights to the song, has said:

It's a beautiful love song. The words in the first line of the chorus: 'Grace just hold me in your arms and let this moment linger' – they are just haunting, and so many people can resonate with it.

The song has been recorded by artists including The Dubliners (including Live from the Gaiety 2002), The Wolfe Tones (You'll Never Beat the Irish, 2001), Rod Stewart (Blood Red Roses, 2018), Foster and Allen, John McDermott, The Barleycorn, Anthony Kearns, The Irish Tenors, Donna Taggart (Celtic Lady, 2011), The High Kings (Grace & Glory, 2016), and Chloë Agnew (Reimagined, 2019) Jim McCann recorded an album Grace and other Irish Love Songs in 1986.

In 2016 a recording was made by an Irish band Glaslevin as a fund-raiser for Celtic F.C.'s ultras supporters group Green Brigade, and in February 2024 members of the group were being encouraged to sing the song as a gesture of support for Palestine, with a statement: "'Grace' is a song of love, hope, loss, pain, steadfastness, resistance and freedom. Join us at the start of the match to pay tribute to the fearless people of Palestine".

The rights in the song are owned by former politician Donie Cassidy and his son Peter Cassidy. The song was chosen by poll to be one of the Irish contributions to the EU Songbook, in the category of "Love Songs".

The brothers Frank and Seán O'Meara, who wrote the song, are from Mullingar, County Westmeath. In 2024 they were given the Gradam Na hÉigse award for their "long-time commitment to Irish culture and heritage".
