= Frank O'Meara (songwriter) =

Irish songwriter

Francis Xavier O'Meara, known as Frank O'Meara, is an Irish songwriter from Mullingar, best known for the song "Grace", which he wrote in 1985 with his brother, Séan O'Meara. The song was covered by both Irish and international artists, and is about the artist Grace Gifford and her marriage to Joseph Plunkett hours before his execution. The lyrics were written by Séan and the melody composed by Frank.

"Grace" was first recorded in 1986 by Jim McCann, and was in the Irish charts for over half a year. It has been covered by many, including Rod Stewart and The Dubliners. The O'Meara brothers appeared on stage with Rod Stewart during his concert at Dublin's 3 Arena.

The brothers also wrote the song "Meet Me At The Pillar", recorded by Jim McCann and others. The "pillar" of the title is Nelson's Pillar, which stood in Dublin from 1809 to 1966.

In 2023 the Mullingar Comhaltas Ceoltóirí Éireann awarded Séan and Frank O'Meara the Gradam Na hÉigse for their "long-time commitment to Irish culture and heritage".
