= Meara =

Meara may refer to:

- Meara (name)
- Meara, a fictional kingdom described in the Deryni novels of Katherine Kurtz
- Meara (worm), a genus of acoela worms

== See also ==
- O'Meara, a common surname
- Meera
- Mara (name)
