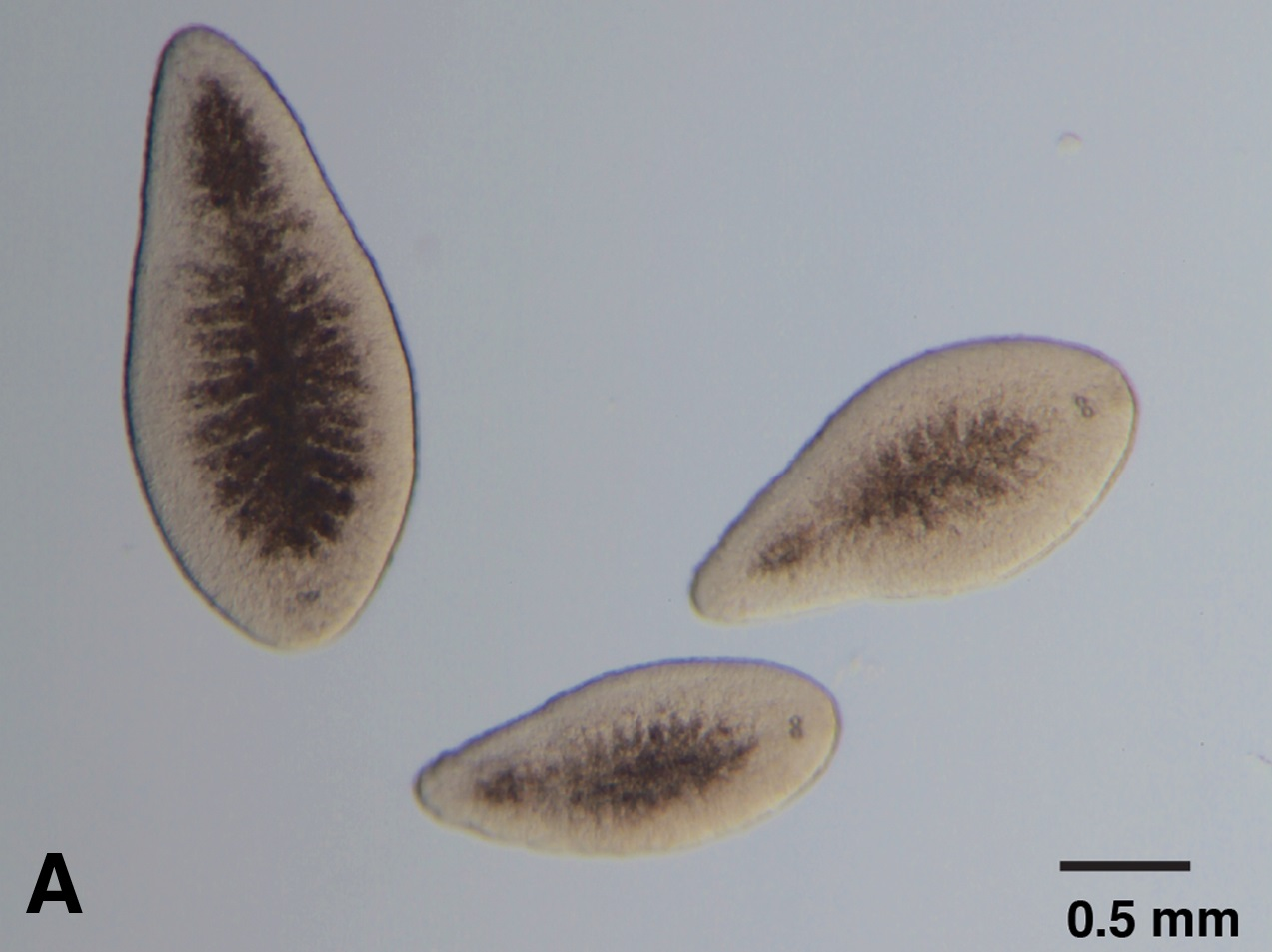
- Three Meara stichopi

Scientific classification
- Kingdom: Animalia
- Phylum: Xenacoelomorpha
- Class: Nemertodermatida
- Family: Nemertodermatidae; Steinböck, 1930

Genera
- See text

= Nemertodermatidae =

Family of acoelomorphs

Nemertodermatidae is a family of wormlike animals in the phylum Acoelomorpha. They are similar to the flatworms of the phylum Platyhelminthes, and were traditionally classified as such.

These are hermaphroditic marine worms with ciliated bodies containing a "sack-like gut".

There are four genera:

- Meara
  - Meara stichopi Westblad 1949
- Nemertinoides
  - Nemertinoides elongatus Riser 1987
  - Nemertinoides glandulosum
  - Nemertinoides wolfgangi
- Nemertoderma
  - Nemertoderma bathycola Steinböck 1930
  - Nemertoderma westbladi (Westblad) Steinböck, 1938
- Sterreria
  - Sterreria boucheti
  - Sterreria lundini
  - Sterreria martindalei
  - Sterreria monolithes
  - Sterreria papuensis
  - Sterreria psammicola (Sterrer 1970)
  - Sterreria rubra
  - Sterreria variabilis
  - Sterreria ylvae
