= Peter O'Meara (rugby union) =

Peter O'Meara was the inaugural CEO of the Western Force rugby union team. He was appointed in March 2005 following the successful bid by RugbyWA for the right to host the fourth Australian franchise. O'Meara had previously been on the boards of the NSWRU and QRU and had moved to Western Australia in his capacity as an executive with the Commonwealth Bank.

After the launch of Western Force and two completed seasons in the Super 14 competition, O'Meara resigned as CEO in January 2008. This followed RugbyWA being fined $150,000 by the Australian Rugby Union for a breach of protocols relating to player contracts. The controversial fuel technology company Firepower Holdings, run by O'Meara's friend Tony Johnston, had provided sponsorship deals which were a major factor in luring high-profile players including Wallaby star Matt Giteau and others to play for the Western Force. Firepower's Australian operations were put into liquidation in early July 2008 in the Federal Court of Australia, leaving Giteau and a number of other sportsmen owed millions of dollars by Firepower.

He was succeeded as CEO of the Force by Greg Harris, appointed in March 2008. O'Meara was appointed as CEO of the Catholic Metropolitan Cemeteries Trust in Sydney in 2010.In 2023, O'Meara received the Papal Honour of the Knight of St Gregory the Great.

== Sources ==
- Ryle, Gerard (2009). Firepower: The most spectacular fraud in Australian history (PDF). Sydney: Allen and Unwin. ISBN 978-1-74175-355-4. Archived (PDF) from the original on 3 March 2012.
