= Black and Tan Gun =

Single by Pat Smyth And The Johnny Flynn Showband
- B-side: "Your Mother's Prayer"
- Released: February 1966
- Recorded: 1966
- Genre: Irish traditional, Irish rebel, showband, country and Irish
- Length: 3:39
- Label: Emerald
- Songwriters: Mervyn Allen and P. Raymond

"Black and Tan Gun" is a 1966 Irish traditional single written by Mervyn Allen and P. Raymond, and performed by Irish showband singer Pat Smyth and the Johnny Flynn Showband.

== Lyrics ==
The song describes an Irish Republican Army volunteer who fights in the Irish War of Independence in a skirmish near Bantry, being killed in combat by a member of the Black and Tans (the additional men recruited into the Royal Irish Constabulary in 1920–21, named for their uniforms, which mixed police black with military khaki). The slain volunteer asks to be buried on a hill overlooking the battlesite, underneath a cross and facing the sun.

== Song history ==
The tune was based on a country song by Jimmie Davis, "Nobody's Darling but Mine."

The song was released under the Emerald label in February 1966; it was one of several Irish nationalist songs released in that year, which marked the 50th anniversary of the Easter Rising. It climbed to Number One in the Irish Singles Chart in April/May of 1966, despite a Radio Éireann rule that "rebel music" could not be played on sponsored programmes.
