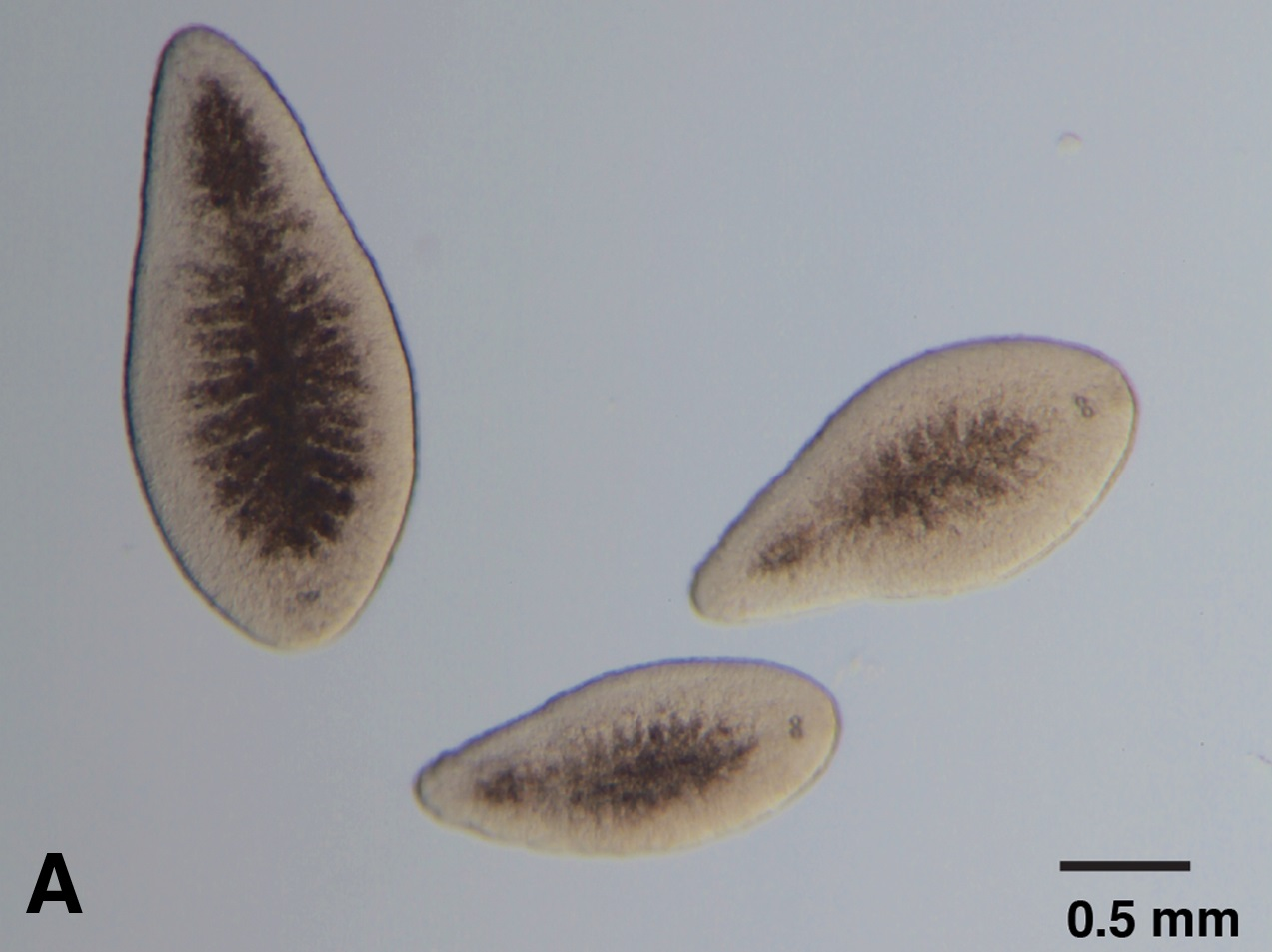
- Three individuals of Meara stichopi with a length between 1–2 mm.

Scientific classification
- Kingdom: Animalia
- Phylum: Xenacoelomorpha
- Class: Nemertodermatida
- Family: Nemertodermatidae
- Genus: Meara; Westblad, 1949
- Species: M. stichopi

Binomial name
- Meara stichopi Westblad, 1949

= Meara stichopi =

Species of acoelomorph

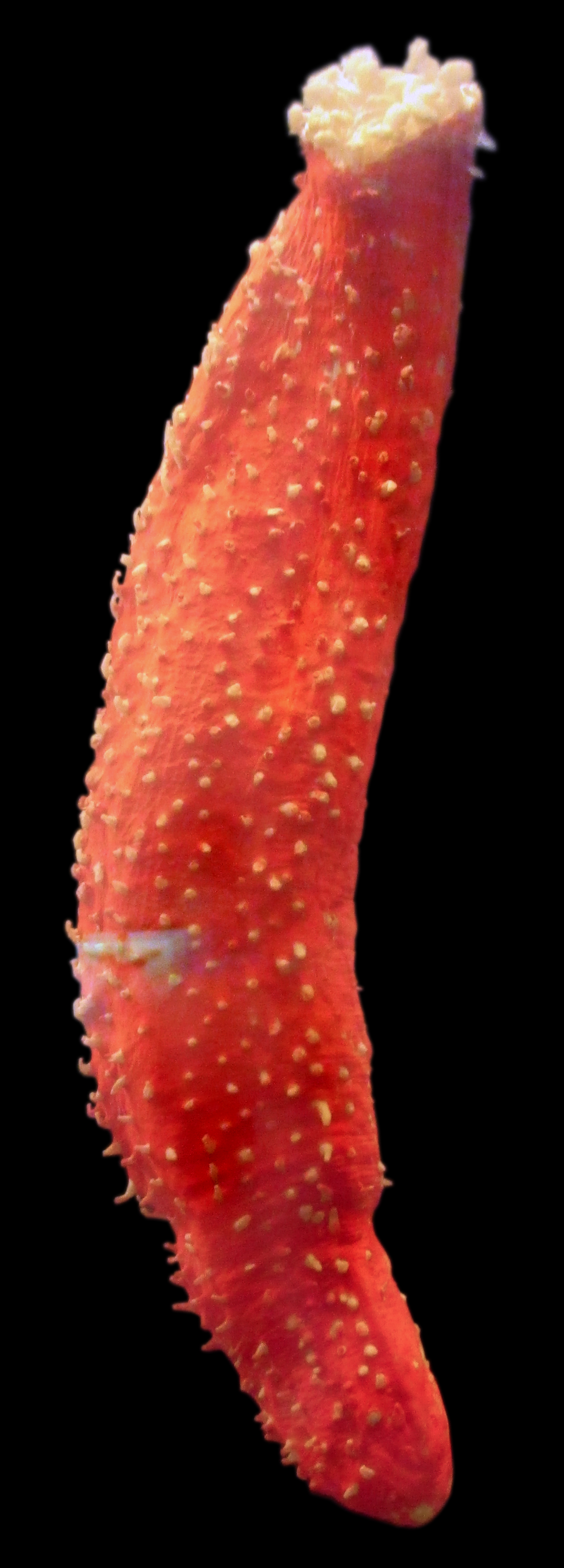
Meara stichopi parasitizes the gut of this sea cucumber Parastichopus tremulus

Meara is a genus of bilaterally symmetric, small aquatic worms in the phylum Xenacoelomorpha, class Nemertodermatida. This genus contains only one species, Meara stichopi, a parasite of the sea cucumber Parastichopus tremulus. It occurs in Norway and Sweden.
