= Barry O'Meara =

Irish surgeon (1786–1836)

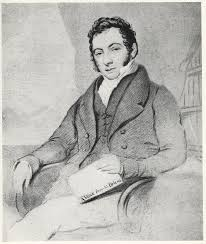
O'Meara, holding a copy of his book, A Voice From St. Helena (1822)

Barry Edward O'Meara (1786 – 1836) was an Irish surgeon and founding member of the Reform Club who accompanied Napoleon to Saint Helena and became his physician, having been surgeon on board HMS Bellerophon when the emperor surrendered himself. He was a medical graduate of Trinity College Dublin.

== Life ==
O'Meara is remembered as the author of Napoleon in Exile, or A Voice From St. Helena (1822) a book which charged Sir Hudson Lowe with mistreating the former emperor and created no small sensation on its appearance. Less known are his secret letters he sent clandestinely from Saint Helena to a clerk at the Admiralty in London. These letters shed a unique light on Napoleon's state of mind as a captive and the causes of his complaints against Lowe and the British government.

O'Meara was also the physician to have performed the very first medical operation on Napoleon: by extracting a wisdom tooth in the autumn of 1817.

== Legacy ==
O'Meara's granddaughter, Kathleen O'Meara was a Catholic writer based in Paris.

O'Meara was portrayed by Michael Williams in the 1972 Anglo-American historical drama film Eagle in a Cage.

== See also ==
- François Carlo Antommarchi, physician, 1780-1838
- Dermod O'Meara, physician, c. 1614-42
- Edmund O'Meara, physician, c. 1614-81
- Kathleen O'Meara, writer, 1839-1888
