= Dermot O'Brien =

Irish musician and Gaelic footballer (1932–2007)

Personal information
- Native name: Diarmuid Ó Briain (Irish)
- Born: 23 October 1932 Ardee, County Louth, Ireland
- Died: 22 May 2007 (aged 74) Ardee, County Louth, Ireland
- Occupation: Musician

Sport
- Sport: Gaelic football
- Position: Centre-forward
Club
- Years: Club
- 1949–1960: St Mary's
Club titles
- Louth titles: 3
Inter-county
- Years: County
- 1952–1960: Louth
Inter-county titles
- Leinster titles: 2
- All-Irelands: 1
- NFL: 0

Dermot O'Brien (23 October 1932 – 22 May 2007) was an Irish céilí and showband musician and singer, as well as a Gaelic footballer who played as a centre-forward at senior level for the Louth senior football team.

== Gaelic football career ==
O'Brien made his first appearance for the Louth team during the 1952 championship and was a regular member of the starting fifteen until a broken finger ended his career in 1960. During that time he has won one All-Ireland winners' medal and two Leinster winners' medals. In 1957 O'Brien captained the team to the All-Ireland title.

At club level O'Brien was a three-time county club championship medalist with St Mary's.

== Musical career ==
A long-time amateur musician, in 1962 O'Brien became a professional musician when his band the Clubmen went professional; O'Brien played the piano accordion for the band rather than the more typical Irish button accordion. Dermot O'Brien and the Clubmen had considerable musical success, with their hit single "The Merry Ploughboy" (a cover of a Jeremiah Lynch/Dominic Behan song about joining the Irish Republican Army) reaching the top of the Irish Singles Chart in only seven days and holding that position for six weeks in late 1966. The single was rushed to market to compete with a Top 100-ranking cover of the same song by the Abbey Tavern Singers.

In the late 1960s, O'Brien began his own RTÉ show called The Styles of O'Brien.

In 2018, Brown University students started a Dermot O'Brien appreciation club.

== Personal life ==
In 1962, Dermot married Rosemarie Walshe of Ballinacurra, Limerick City. Rosemarie died in New York in 2005.

Sporting positions
Preceded by Patsy Coleman	Louth Senior Football Captain; 1957–1958	Succeeded by Jim McArdle

Preceded by Jack Mangan (Galway)	All-Ireland Senior Football Final winning captain 1957	Succeeded by Kevin Heffernan (Dublin)
