= The Merry Ploughboy =

"The Merry Ploughboy (Off To Dublin In The Green)"
- Cover of the Danish release (EMI)

Single by Dermot O'Brien and his Clubmen

from the album The Merry Ploughboy
- B-side: "Come Down The Mountain, Katie Daly"
- Released: 1966
- Recorded: 1966
- Genre: Irish traditional
- Length: 2:30
- Label: Envoy
- Songwriters: Jeremiah Lynch, arr. Dominic Behan

Dermot O'Brien and his Clubmen singles chronology
"The Merry Ploughboy (Off To Dublin In The Green)" (1966)	"I Walk The Line" (1973)

"The Merry Ploughboy" is an Irish traditional song by Jeremiah Lynch, known for a successful 1966 version by Dermot O'Brien.

== Song history ==
"The Merry Ploughboy" was written by Jeremiah Lynch during the Irish War of Independence. It alters the lyrics of an English folk tune, "The Jolly Ploughboy," about an Englishman who leaves behind the plough to join the British Army. "The Merry Ploughboy" is about an Irish farmer who joins the Irish Republican Army (IRA), and talks about going to Dublin in order to fight and retrieve "the land the Saxon stole."

"The Merry Ploughboy (Off To Dublin In The Green)" was released by Dermot O'Brien (who also played accordion on the track) in 1966 to mark the 50th anniversary of the Easter Rising, with an arrangement by Dominic Behan, and was number one on the Irish Singles Chart for six weeks. Kevin Myers described it as "one of the most influential songs of pre-Troubles Ireland." O'Brien confessed to being less comfortable with singing the song once the Troubles had begun, saying in 1975 "at that time [1966] there was no trouble in the North and the record was a great hit. I am still asked to sing it, although I am completely against violence and don't think that sort of song goes well at the present moment."
