= Dermod O'Meara =

Dermod O'Meara (Irish: Diarmaid Ó Meadhra; fl. 1610–1646) was an Irish physician and poet, author of the first medical work printed in Dublin in 1619. He was the father of Edmund O'Meara.

== Biography ==
He was a son of Domhnaill O'Meara, lord of the Ó Meadhra lineage and foster-father to Thomas Butler. His family were hereditary physicians and poets to the Earls of Ormond.

O'Meara's first published work—also the first book of Latin verse published in Ireland—was Ormonius, published in 1614. It is a praise poem in the epic style about the life of Thomas Butler. In it, O'Meara describes himself as one of the vates, and claims that Thomas was suckled as a baby by Áine, an Irish goddess.

Subsequently, O'Meara studied medicine at, and graduated from, Reims University. He returned To Ireland and wrote De Moribus: Pathologia Hereditaria Generalis, a text on hereditary diseases. In It, he claims that some diseases as well as other traits are inherited, that there are two sets of hereditary information, one from the mother and one from the father, and that weak traits may be masked by strong traits.

In later life, O'Meara and his family broke with the house of Ormond during the Confederation of Kilkenny, in which they favored a complete break with England. Dermod was reported to have gone to the court of King Charles I. He was indicted in Ireland for high treason, but apparently never apprehended.
