= Seán O'Meara (Offaly hurler) =

Irish hurler

Personal information
- Native name: Seán Ó Meára (Irish)
- Born: Shinrone, County Offaly, Ireland

Sport
- Sport: Hurling
- Position: Midfielder
Club
- Years: Club
- Shinrone
Club titles
- Offaly titles: 0
Inter-county*
Years	County	Apps (scores)
1980-1981	Offaly	1 (0-00)
Inter-county titles
- Leinster titles: 0
- All-Irelands: 0
- NHL: 0
- All Stars: 0
- *Inter County team apps and scores correct as of 15:19, 29 June 2014.

Seán O'Meara is an Irish retired hurler who played as a midfielder for the Offaly senior team.

Born in Shinrone, County Offaly, O'Meara first played competitive hurling in his youth. He made his senior debut with Offaly during the 1980-81 National League and immediately became a regular member of the team. During his career O'Meara won a set of All-Ireland and Leinster medals as a non-playing substitute.

At club level O'Meara played with Shinrone.

His retirement came following the conclusion of the 1981 championship.

== Honours ==
=== Team ===
Offaly

- All-Ireland Senior Hurling Championship (1): 1981 (sub)
- Leinster Senior Hurling Championship (5): 1981 (sub)
