= Seán O'Meara (songwriter) =

Irish songwriter

Séan O'Meara is an Irish songwriter from Mullingar, best known for the song "Grace", about Grace Gifford and Joseph Plunkett, which he wrote in 1985 with his brother, Frank O'Meara.

== Music ==
O'Meara wrote "Grace" in 1985 with his brother Frank O'Meara. It is about the artist Grace Gifford and her marriage to Joseph Plunkett hours before his execution. The lyrics were written by Séan and the melody composed by Frank.

"Grace" was first recorded in 1986 by Jim McCann, and was in the Irish charts for over half a year. It has been covered by many, including Rod Stewart and The Dubliners. The O'Meara brothers appeared on stage with Rod Stewart during his concert at Dublin's 3 Arena.

The brothers also wrote the song "Meet Me At The Pillar", recorded by Jim McCann and others. The "pillar" of the title is Nelson's Pillar, which stood in Dublin from 1809 to 1966.

In 2023 the Mullingar Comhaltas Ceoltóirí Éireann awarded Séan and Frank O'Meara the Gradam Na hÉigse for their "long-time commitment to Irish culture and heritage".

== Other activities ==
O'Meara was chief executive of Young Advertising for 15 years. He became chair of the Advertising Standards Authority for Ireland (ASAI) in 2013, holding the post for nine years.

In 2023 O'Meara published a book of ten short stories, White Shadows (Austin Macauley Publishers, ISBN 9781398488205), described by the publishers as "an intriguing look behind our human selves under conditions of inhibited expectations and imposed conformities".

== Personal life ==
O'Meara lives in Dublin. He is married to Finola and as of 2023 has three children and six grandchildren.
