= Kathleen O'Meara (writer) =

Irish writer (1839–1888)

- Born: 1839; Dublin
- Died: 10 November 1888 (aged 48–49); Paris
- Writing career
- Pen name: Grace Ramsay

Kathleen O'Meara, also known under her pen name Grace Ramsay (1839 – 10 November 1888), was an Irish-French Catholic writer and biographer during the late Victorian era. She was the Paris correspondent of The Tablet, a leading British Catholic magazine. Irish Monthly also published many of her serialized and biographical works. O'Meara also wrote works of fiction where she explored a variety of topics from women's suffrage to eastern European revolutions. The majority of her novels contained Catholic themes and social reform issues.

== Life ==
O'Meara was born in Dublin in 1839. Her father was Dennis O'Meara of Tipperary, while her grandfather, Barry Edward O'Meara, had been Napoleon's physician on St. Helena from the years 1815–1818. He later denounced Britain's treatment of the ex-emperor in his exile. This was quite the sensation in 1822. For this reason, Kathleen O'Meara's mother had a pension from the French state. Kathleen immigrated to France soon after she was born with her family, who never returned to Ireland. After leaving Ireland, she lived in Paris for the majority of her life. As she was entirely devoted to her writing career, O'Meara never married, or had any children.

At the age of 49, O'Meara died of pneumonia in her home 15 Rue Washington, Paris on 10 November 1888. Her sister Geraldine Mary, who had been living with her in Paris was sole executrix of O'Meara's will, probate date 8 March 1889, which provided instructions for dispensing her posthumous estate of £3,110. 17s. 4d.

== Literary career ==
While O'Meara did not have great success at the beginning of her career but succeeded in winning fame later in life, her own experiences led her to encourage young and aspiring authors. Despite living in France, O'Meara's English novels, biographies, and periodical articles found great success in her last two decades of life.

O'Meara wrote novels that were focused on issues in Catholicism and biographies of leading Catholics. Her publishers tried to forestall any pre-disposed discrimination against her Irish heritage by giving her the less Catholic nom-de-plume of Grace Ramsay. This led many of her readers to believe her to be English, allowing O'Meara to be mostly well received in Protestant England, despite engaging in controversial writing topics.

=== Irish Catholicism ===
Her first published work was called A Woman's Trials (1867) about a young girl's conversion to Catholicism. After an irate reader Mr. Archer Gurney published an angry letter on 17 September in the periodical John Bull, "refuting imaginary accusations against his theology" that he believed to have discovered in this novel, "Grace Ramsey" published a reply on 5 October in the same publication. She deems Mr. Gurney's opinions "not worth replying to", but adds, "If it pleases the gentleman to recognize his own likeness in the heterodox Mr. Brown of my story, it would be unkind to contradict him." Also, she ends by thanking the periodical's reviewer of her book "especially for having pointed out its aim and object, which was, as he justly surmised, to bid English governesses pause before rushing abroad to try their fortunes."

Robin Redbreast's Victory was serialized in Irish Monthly in 1877. This work shows how improved understanding between denominations may help to solve landlord and tenant problems in Ireland. The Battle of Connemara, published in 1878, is similar in theme to A Woman's Trials. In this novel, an Englishwoman, Lady Peggy Blake, marries an Irish Protestant landlord and moves to Connemara. She is so inspired by her tenants' faith that she converts to Catholicism.

=== European oppression ===
A novel that is viewed as among O'Meara's best published works is The Bells of the Sanctuary, Agnes, published by Burns, Oates and Company in 1871. Iza's Story was her second novel, published by a London firm called Hurst and Blackett. In this novel, she addresses the struggle of Polish Patriots against the Russian occupation. She compares it to the Irish-British situation—both Poland and Ireland are Catholic countries oppressed by non-Catholic nations. This theme of rebellion where a small nation takes on its greater neighbour reappears in some of her other works. Narka, a Story of Russian Life (1888) became one of O'Meara's other more popular novels, sympathetically depicting social problems such as poverty and suffering. While the problem is stated in an unobtrusive manner, the solution is offered through the old, yet new method of Christian charity.

=== Catholic biographies ===
She began to write biographies of historically famous Catholics in the 1870s, a literary development that coincided with her decision to commence publishing under her own name. The first to appear was Frederic Ozanam, professor at the Sorbonne: his life and works in 1876. As The Woman's Journal reported in 1877, "This authoress, known as a writer under the nom de plume of Grace Ramsay, has thrown off her mask, and in her latest works takes her own name. A Paris correspondent writes the Boston Advertiser that if God spares her life, she is destined to make her mark in literature." Praising her for her thoroughness, the review continues, "She has her subject clearly defined, and its details at her finger-ends, before taking pen in hand; and, her story once begun, she has the rare talent of sustaining interest on to the end."

Published posthumously in 1891, The Venerable John Baptiste Vianney, Curé d'Ars was favourably reviewed by The Dublin Review, which commented: "The special claim to notice which Miss O'Meara's life of the Curé of Ars has, is the charming ease and simplicity of her narrative. This Life of the saintly and remarkable priest deserves to be very popular."

=== Other activities ===
She published a journal article in 1872 entitled "A Visit to the Communists", which was published by Harper's Bazaar. She was the Paris correspondent of The Tablet, a leading British Catholic magazine. In the 1880s, she travelled across Europe and The United States, continuing to write novels and biographies as she travelled.

O'Meara also collaborated on the periodical London Society with Florence Marryat.

== Works include ==
Novels:

- A Woman's Trials (London, Hurst and Blackett 1867)
- Iza's Story (Hurst and Blackett, 1869)
- The Bells of the Sanctuary, Agnes (Burns, Oates and Company, 1871)
- Robin Redbreast's Victory (serialized in Irish Monthly, 1877)
- The Battle of Connemara (1878)
- Folette (serialized in The Catholic World, A Magazine of General Literature and Science, 1879)
- Diana Coryval (1883)
- Queen by Right Divine and other Tales (Burns and Oates, 1885)
- The Old House in Picardy (London, Richards Bentley and Son, (1887)
- Narka, a Story of Russian Life, (1888)
- The Blind Apostle (Burns and Oates, 1890)

Biographies:

- Frederic Ozanam, professor at the Sorbonne: his life and works (1876)
- Madame Mohl: Her Society and Friends (Wentworth Press, 1885)
- The Venerable John Baptiste Vianney, Curé d'Ars (her last publication, published posthumously, 1891)
