= Bathyspadella =

Scientific classification
- Kingdom: Animalia
- Phylum: Chaetognatha
- Class: Sagittoidea
- Order: Phragmophora
- Family: Spadellidae
- Genus: Bathyspadella; Tokioka, 1939

Genus of marine worms

Bathyspadella is a genus of chaetognaths in the family Spadellidae. The genus shares morphological similarities to Eukrohniidae and Spadellidae, although it is molecularly similar to Heterokrohniidae. The unusual position of Bathyspadella would indicate a need to revise the existing order of Phragmophora; however, that would be very difficult, as a number of genera and species exist only in small or difficult to access populations, by which it would be difficult to fully examine all related species. A review of the Chaetognatha, published after the discovery of B. oxydentata, found that the standard division of Phragmophora and Aphragmophora to be improper molecularly, noting the close morphological convergence of the Krohnittidae (Aphragmophora) and Xenokrohnia (Phragmophora: Heterokrohniidae).

== Species ==
- Bathyspadella edentata Tokioka, 1939
- Bathyspadella oxydentata Miyamoto & Nishida, 2011
