= Xenokrohnia =

Scientific classification
- Kingdom: Animalia
- Phylum: Chaetognatha
- Class: Sagittoidea
- Order: Phragmophora
- Family: Heterokrohniidae
- Genus: Xenokrohnia; Casanova, 1993
- Species: X. sorbei

Binomial name
- Xenokrohnia sorbei Casanova, 1993

Genus of marine worms

Xenokrohnia is a genus of chaetognaths in the family Heterokrohniidae. It consists of one species, Xenokrohnia sorbei Casanova, 1993, which lives in a marine environment. The initial discovery was made from six specimens found in a deep-sea search in the Bay of Biscay for Spadella equidentata Casanova, 1987. A uniquely large (ventral) secretory gland, separate from other chaetognaths, defined the new genus and species. The gland, which is likely used to rid the body of digestive fluids, is probably due to the unique feeding habits of the species; these may include scavenging habits. The presence of an unusual and seemingly superfluous digestive utility is similar to Archeterokrohnia palpifera Casanova, 1986, which have a larger pair of pedipalps then what is common for chaetognaths.
