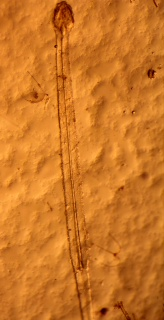
- Parasagitta elegans

Scientific classification
- Kingdom: Animalia
- Phylum: Chaetognatha
- Class: Sagittoidea
- Order: Aphragmophora
- Family: Sagittidae
- Genus: Parasagitta; Tokioka, 1965

Species
- See text

= Parasagitta =

Genus of marine worms

Parasagitta is a genus of arrow worms (phylum Chaetognatha) in the family Sagittidae. At one time these arrow worms were classified in the genus Sagitta.

== Species ==
The World Register of Marine Species includes the following species in the genus:

- Parasagitta chilensis (Villenas & Palma, 2006)
- Parasagitta elegans (Verrill, 1873)
- Parasagitta euneritica (Alvariño, 1961)
- Parasagitta friderici (Ritter-Záhony, 1911)
- Parasagitta megalophthalma (Dallot & Ducret, 1969)
- Parasagitta peruviana (Sund, 1961)
- Parasagitta popovicii (Sund, 1961)
- Parasagitta setosa (Müller, 1847)
- Parasagitta tenuis (Conant, 1896)
