= Hemispadella =

Scientific classification
- Kingdom: Animalia
- Phylum: Chaetognatha
- Class: Sagittoidea
- Order: Phragmophora
- Family: Spadellidae
- Genus: Hemispadella; Casanova, 1996
- Species: H. dauvini

Binomial name
- Hemispadella dauvini Casanova, 1996

Genus of marine worms

Hemispadella is a genus of chaetognaths in the family Spadellidae. It consists of one species, Hemispadella dauvini Casanova, 1996. The species, as the generic name implies, shares numerous, but not all, of the characteristics of Spadellidae; it shares a number of other characteristics with Heterokrohniidae. The ventral ganglion, poorly described in chaetognaths, is of similar size to the Heterokrohniidae, and the larger number of teeth, and the difference in appearance and function between the anterior and posterior teeth, are similarly characteristic. The relative tail size is similar to that of the Spadellidae, although the overall size is unprecedented among the Spadellidae. The more developed nature of transverse musculature and the basis for the lateral fins are as those of Spadellidae, as well.
