= Calispadella =

Scientific classification
- Kingdom: Animalia
- Phylum: Chaetognatha
- Class: Sagittoidea
- Order: Phragmophora
- Family: Spadellidae
- Genus: Calispadella; Casanova & Moreau, 2005
- Species: C. alata

Binomial name
- Calispadella alata Casanova & Moreau, 2005

Genus of marine worms

Calispadella is a genus of chaetognaths in the family Spadellidae. It consists of one species, Calispadella alata Casanova & Moreau, 2005. It is differentiated from other species of Spadellidae by the presence of an unusually long tail segment and a rare aspect of the lateral fins, similar to that of Paraspadella gotoi Casanova, 1990. The species is noted by the complete development of seminal vesicles in juveniles and the use of lateral fins for buoyancy in the deep-sea waters where the specimens were found. It was the first to be described exclusively in the range of deep-sea hydrothermic vents.

Although most of the species who live in ocean depths have delayed sexual maturity, Calispadella alata have their seminal vesicles already well developed. While they live in the ocean, they can also mate in populations that have limited resources since they are sexually precocious.
