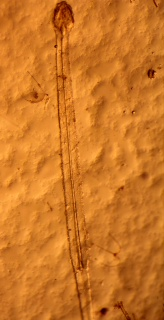

Conservation status
- Secure (NatureServe)

Scientific classification
- Kingdom: Animalia
- Phylum: Chaetognatha
- Class: Sagittoidea
- Order: Aphragmophora
- Family: Sagittidae
- Genus: Parasagitta
- Species: P. elegans

Binomial name
- Parasagitta elegans (Verrill, 1873)

= Parasagitta elegans =

Species of marine worm

Parasagitta elegans, the elegant arrow worm, is a small arrow worm in the family Sagittidae, previously named Sagitta elegans.

== Morphology ==
Parasagitta elegans (prev. Sagitta elegans). Body of adult animal can grow up to 45 mm, is narrow, firm and opaque (this image: animal very see-through. Visible opaque animal needs better picture).

Fins are separated, rounded, and completely rayed. Anterior fins beginning below the ventral ganglion. Alimentary diverticula present. Eyes with small, round pigment spot. Ovaries long and narrow. Seminal vesicles conical in shape, either exactly next to or very close to the tail fin, separated from posterior fins.

For anatomy, reproduction, classification, and fossil record; see Chaetognatha.

== Taxonomy ==
Three subspecies are recognised - P. elegans arctica, P. elegans baltica and P. elegans elegans. The subspecies are considered to vary in size depending on the temperature of the waters in which they develop, which could be an indication of them being synonymous species. The numbers of hooks and teeth vary slightly in the three subspecies.

== Ecology ==
=== General ===
With exception for the benthic species Spadella, arrow worms are all adapted for planktonic existence. They swim to the surface at night when it is safer for them to hunt, and descend during daytime. Most of the time they drift passively, but they can dart forward in swift spurts, using their caudal fin and longitudinal muscles. Horizontal fins bordering the trunk serve largely as stabilizers, and are used in flotation rather than in active swimming.

=== Distribution ===
Parasagitta elegans and the three subspecies occur in Arctic and subarctic waters. P. elegans elegans is a coastal subspecies with oceanic influence. P. elegans arctica is a boreal-arctic form, and P. elegans baltica is the smallest form, found only in or near the Baltic Sea. All subspecies are typically found in waters 0-200m deep.
