= List of bioluminescent organisms =

Omphalotus nidiformis

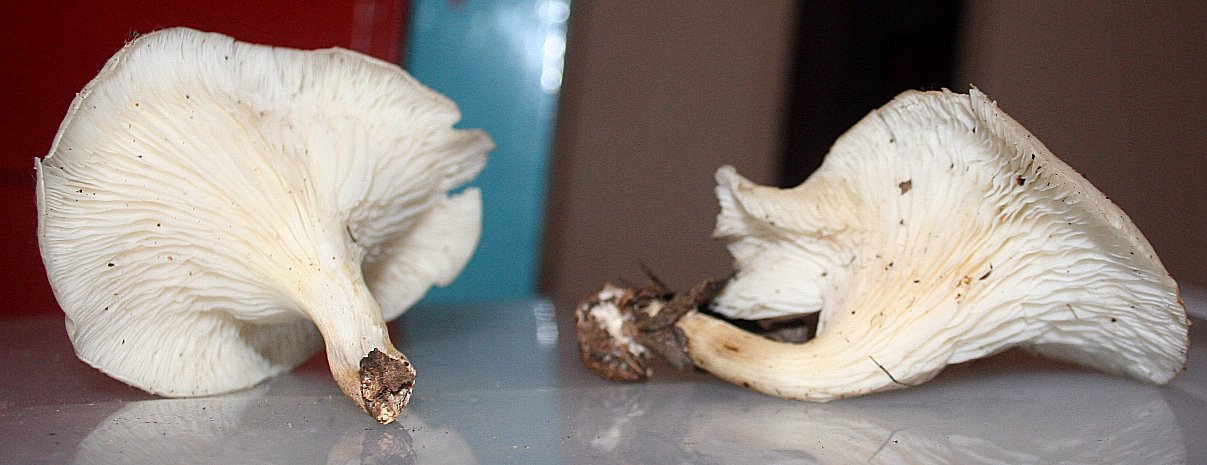
A bioluminescent mushroom ...

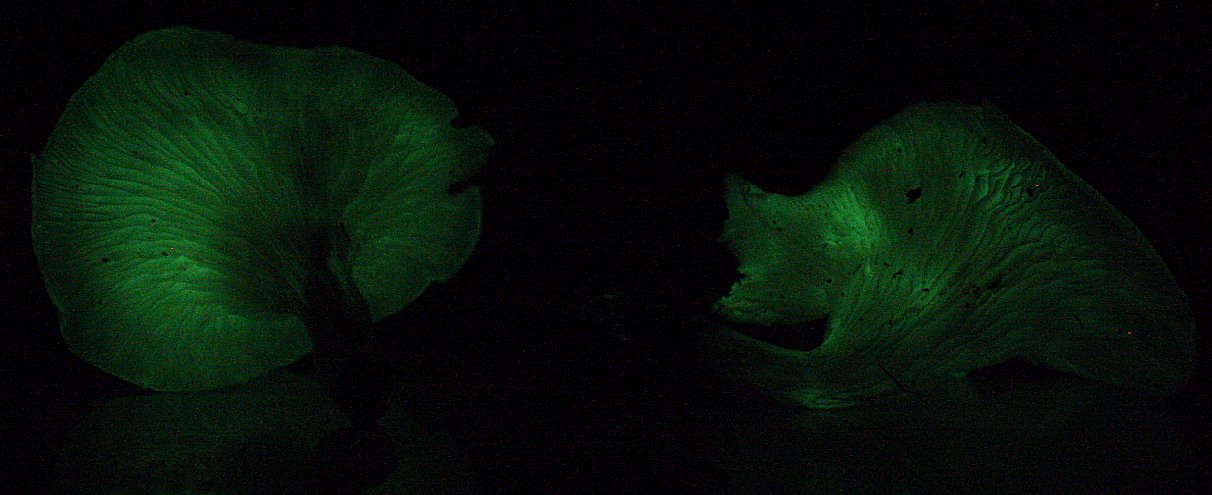
...glowing with the lights off.

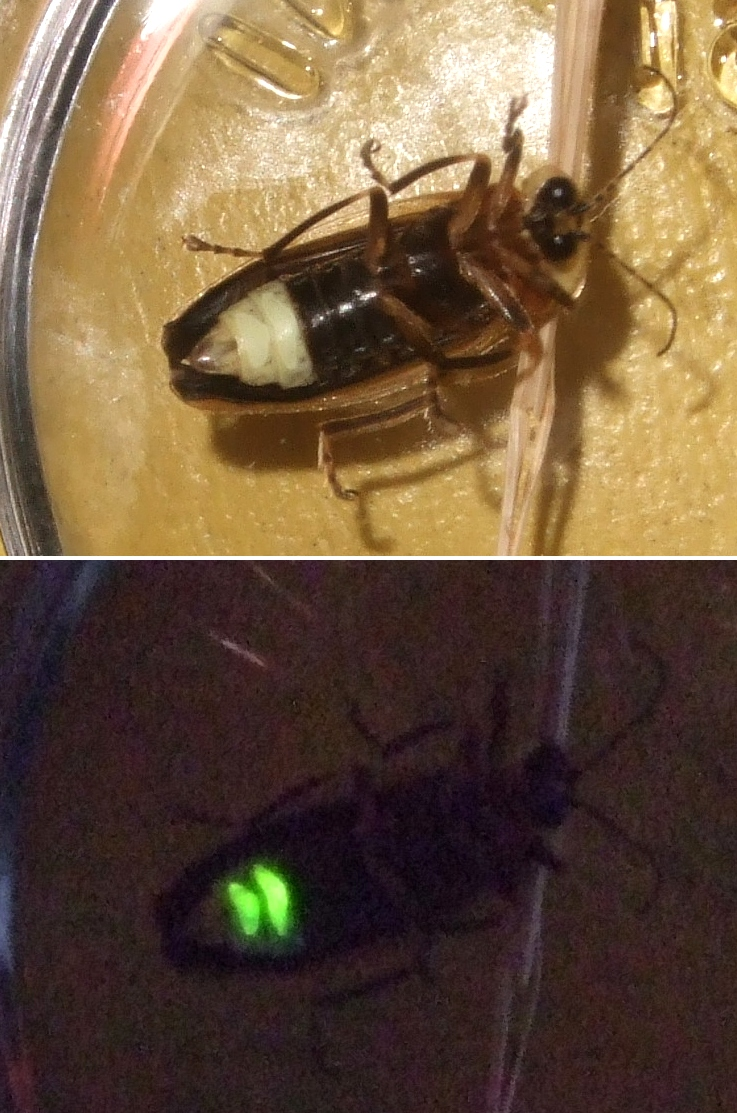
Firefly (species unknown) with and without flash.

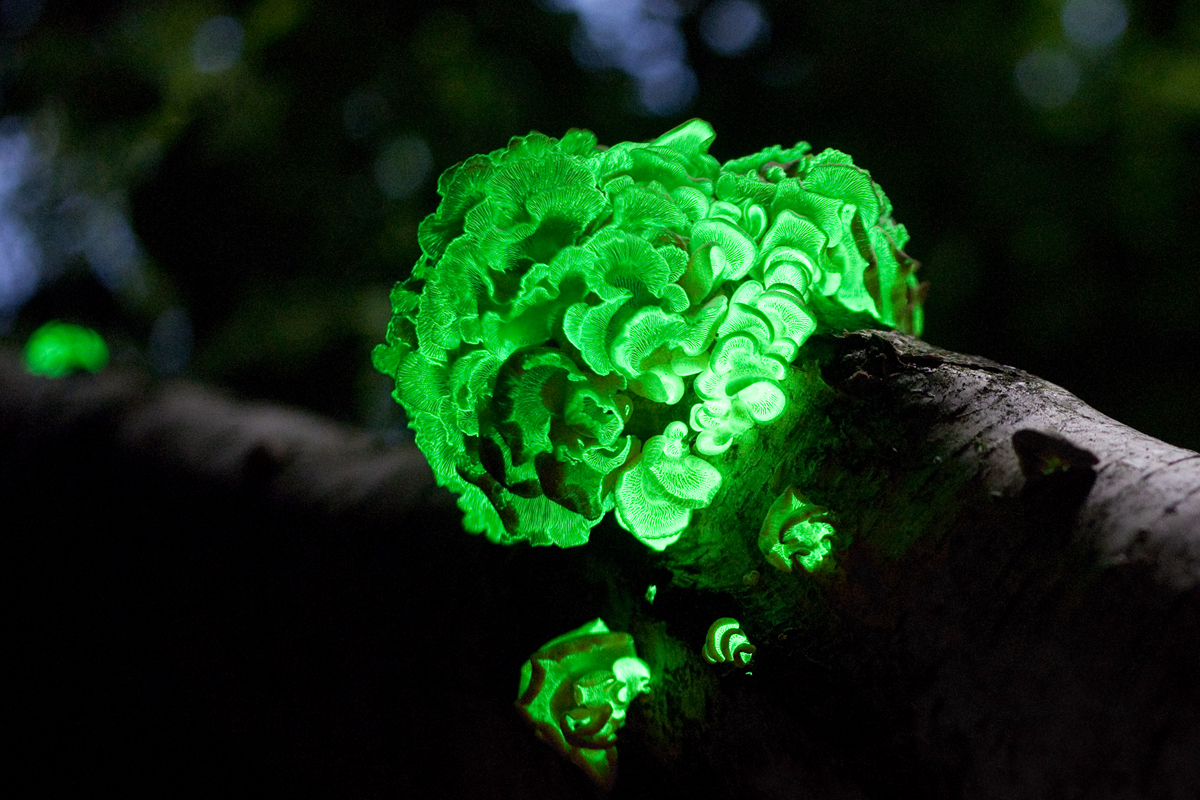
Foxfire in the fungus Panellus stipticus

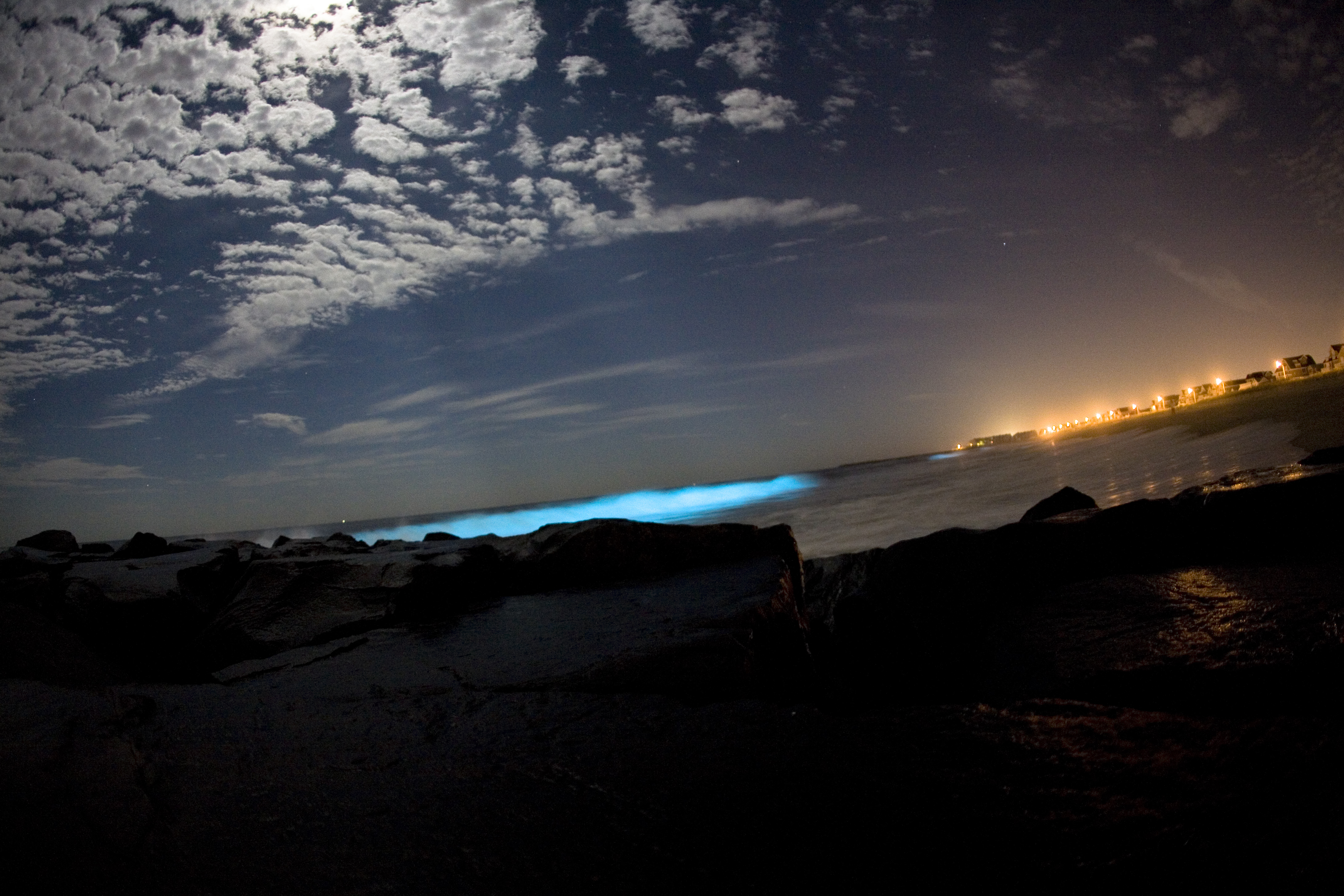
Blue ocean glow caused by myriad tiny organisms, such as Noctiluca.

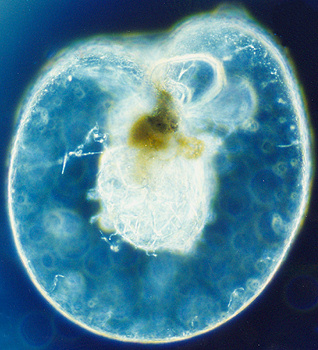
Noctiluca scintillans, a bioluminescent dinoflagellate

Bioluminescence is the production of light by living organisms. The environment organizes this list of bioluminescent organisms, covering terrestrial, marine, and microorganisms.

== Terrestrial animals ==
- Certain arthropods
  - Coleoptera (beetles)
    - Lampyridae (Fireflies)
    - Phengodidae (Glowworm beetles)
      - railroad worms
    - Rhagophthalmidae
    - Sinopyrophoridae
    - Certain Elateridae (Click beetles)
      - Pyrophorini
      - Balgus
      - Campyloxenus
  - Diptera (true flies)
    - Certain keroplatid fungus gnats
  - Myriapoda
    - Certain centipedes
      - Geophilus carpophagus
      - Orphnaeus brevilabiatus
    - Certain millipedes
      - Genus Motyxia
- Some land snails
  - Quantula striata
  - Quantula weinkauffiana
  - Genus Phuphania
- Annelids
  - Octochaetus multiporus
  - Microscolex phosphoreus
  - Pontodrilus litoralis

== Marine animals ==
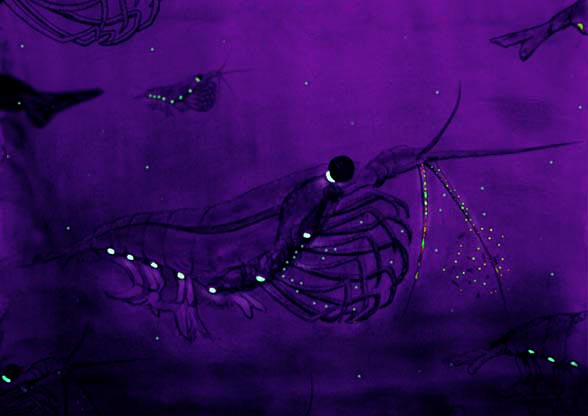
Artist's rendering of Antarctic krill

=== Fish ===
- Anglerfish
- Gulper eel
- Lanternfish
- Stomiiformes
  - Marine hatchetfish
  - Viperfish
  - Black dragonfish
- Midshipman fish
- Pineconefish
- Lanterneye fish
- Some Squaliformes
  - Lantern sharks
  - Kitefin sharks
  - Velvet dogfish

=== Invertebrates ===
- A deep-sea species of carnivorous sponge (Cladorhizidae)
- Many Cnidarians
  - Sea pens
    - Renilla reniformis
  - Coral
  - Certain Jellyfish
    - Aequorea victoria
    - Atolla jellyfish
    - Helmet jellyfish
- Certain Ctenophores (comb jellies)
- Some Tunicates:
  - Larvaceans
  - Salps
  - Ascidiacea
  - Doliolida
  - Pyrosomes
- Certain echinoderms (e.g. Ophiurida)
  - Amphiura filiformis
  - Ophiopsila aranea
  - Ophiopsila californica
  - Amphipholis squamata
- Many Crustaceans:
  - Seed shrimp (Myodocopa)
  - Copepods
  - Lophogastrids (Gnathophausia)
  - Amphipods
  - Krill
  - Decapods (shrimp and prawn)
    - Genus Heterocarpus
- Two species of Chaetognaths (arrow worms)
  - Caecosagitta macrocephala
  - Eukrohnia fowleri
- Annelida
  - Genus Tomopteris
  - Genus Swima
  - Certain polynoids
- Mollusca
  - Certain Bivalves (clams)
    - Pholas dactylus
  - Certain Nudibranchs (sea slugs)
    - Plocamopherus maderae
  - Certain sea snails
    - Hinea brasiliana
  - Many Cephalopods
    - Certain Octopuses
      - Bolitaenidae
      - Stauroteuthis
    - Vampire squid
    - Sepiolida
    - Many Teuthida (squid)
      - Cranchiidae
        - Colossal Squid
      - Mastigoteuthidae
      - Histioteuthidae
      - Enoploteuthoidea
        - Firefly squid

== Freshwater animals ==
- Latia, a genus of four species of freshwater snail

== Bacteria ==
- Photorhabdus luminescens
- Certain species of the family Vibrionaceae (e.g. Vibrio fischeri, Vibrio harveyi, Photobacterium phosphoreum)
- Certain species of the family Shewanellaceae, (e.g. Shewanella hanedai and Shewanella woodyi)

== Other microorganisms ==
- Protists
  - Certain Dinoflagellates (e.g. Noctiluca scintillans, Pyrodinium bahamense, Pyrocystis fusiformis and Lingulodinium polyedra
