= Eukrohnia hamata =

Scientific classification
- Kingdom: Animalia
- Phylum: Chaetognatha
- Class: Sagittoidea
- Order: Phragmophora
- Family: Eukrohniidae
- Genus: Eukrohnia
- Species: E. hamata

Binomial name
- Eukrohnia hamata Möbius, 1875

Species of marine worms

Eukrohnia hamata is a species of arrow worm, transparent marine invertebrates belonging to the phylum Chaetognatha. Characterized by its unique morphology and adaptation for life in the deep-sea environment, this planktonic predator is widely distributed throughout the world's oceans, and plays an important role in marine ecosystems.

== Taxonomy ==
The first Eukrohnia hamata specimen was identified by Karl Möbius in 1875.

== Description ==
Eukrohnia hamata is a slender, worm-like creature typically reaching lengths of 2–14 mm (0.079–0.551 in). It has a narrow body with a small head not much bigger than the neck. Unlike other arrow worms, it has only one elongated fin on each side of its body. It swims by flexing its body back and forth rapidly, using its fins as a stabilizers, rather than as a propulsive mechanism. It exhibits vertical migration, ascending towards the surface at night to feed and descending to deeper depths during the day. It has oil droplets within its intestine, which are absent in most Sagitta species, another common genus of arrow worms. Developing eggs are carried in brood sacs, that hang each side from the opening of the oviduct.

== Habitat ==
Eukrohnia hamata has a cosmopolitan distribution, meaning it is found in all the world's oceans. Epipelagic in high latitudes and mesopelagic or bathypelagic in lower latitudes. This species lives in miso-bathypelagic zones of the tropical and subtropical oceans, whereas in the sub-arctic and sub-Antarctic regions, it gradually rises to the epipelagic layers. E. hamata, occurs predominantly in the deep basins of the Arctic Ocean.

== Diet ==
The chaetognath Eukrohnia hamata dominates in terms of carnivorous zooplankton abundance in the meso- and bathypelagic zones. To detect its prey it uses tiny hairs along its body to detect motion. To catch its prey they are seized with hooks from a rapid lunge.

Unusually for chaetognaths, Eukrohnia hamata also eats diatoms frequently, suggesting it is not exclusively a carnivore.

== Reproduction ==
As for all chaetognaths, Eukrohnia hamata is hermaphroditic with female gonads located in the posterior part of the trunk section, and male gonads in the tail section.
