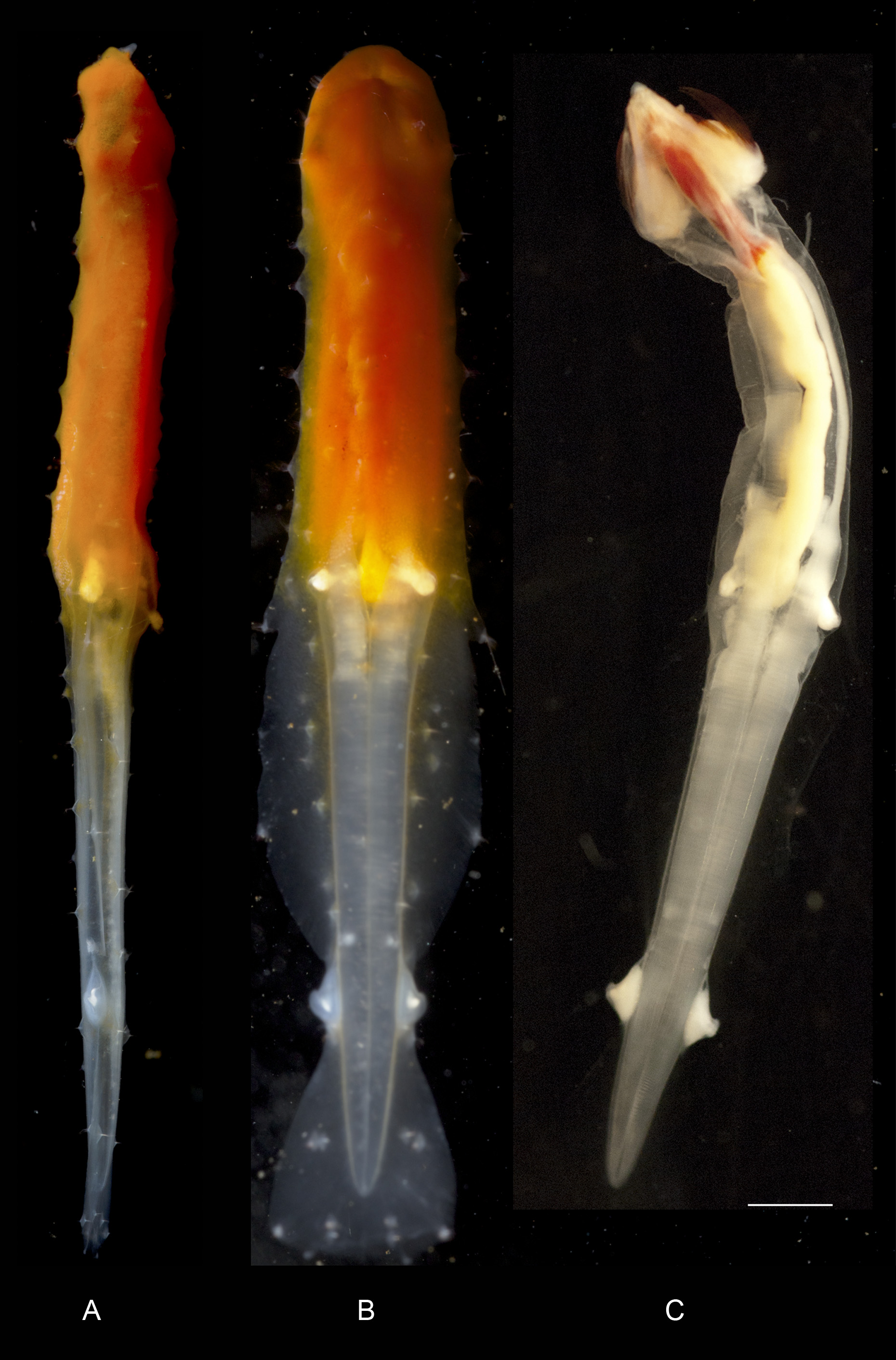
- Archeterokrohnia docrickettsae holotype. A, lateral view, shortly after recovery aboard ship. B, dorsal view, shortly after recovery aboard ship. C, dorsal view, after 4 months preservation in 5% formalin/seawater.

Scientific classification
- Kingdom: Animalia
- Phylum: Chaetognatha
- Class: Sagittoidea
- Order: Phragmophora
- Family: Heterokrohniidae
- Genus: Archeterokrohnia
- Species: A. docrickettsae

Binomial name
- Archeterokrohnia docrickettsae Thuesen & Haddock, 2013

= Archeterokrohnia docrickettsae =

Species of deep-sea marine arrow worm

Archeterokrohnia docrickettsae is a type of deep-sea marine arrow worm. It is the largest species in the Archeterokrohnia genus and the first to be found alive. Additionally this species displays an unusual color pattern of orange on its head and trunk with a translucent tail.
