= Heterokrohnia =

Scientific classification
- Kingdom: Animalia
- Phylum: Chaetognatha
- Class: Sagittoidea
- Order: Phragmophora
- Family: Heterokrohniidae
- Genus: Heterokrohnia von Ritter-Záhony, 1911

Genus of marine worms

Heterokrohnia is a genus of chaetognaths in the family Heterokrohniidae.

== Species ==
- Heterokrohnia alvinae Casanova, 1992
- Heterokrohnia angeli Casanova, 1994
- Heterokrohnia bathybia Marumo & Kitou, 1966
- Heterokrohnia biscayensis Casanova, 1994
- Heterokrohnia curvichaeta Casanova, 1986
- Heterokrohnia davidi Casanova, 1986
- Heterokrohnia discoveryi Casanova, 1994
- Heterokrohnia fragilis Kapp & Hagen, 1985
- Heterokrohnia furnestinae Casanova & Chidgey, 1987
- Heterokrohnia heterodonta Casanova, 1986
- Heterokrohnia involucrum Dawson, 1968
- Heterokrohnia longidentata Kapp & Hagen, 1985
- Heterokrohnia mirabilis von Ritter-Záhony, 1911
- Heterokrohnia mirabiloides Casanova & Chidgey, 1990
- Heterokrohnia murina Casanova, 1986
- Heterokrohnia wishernae Casanova, 1992
