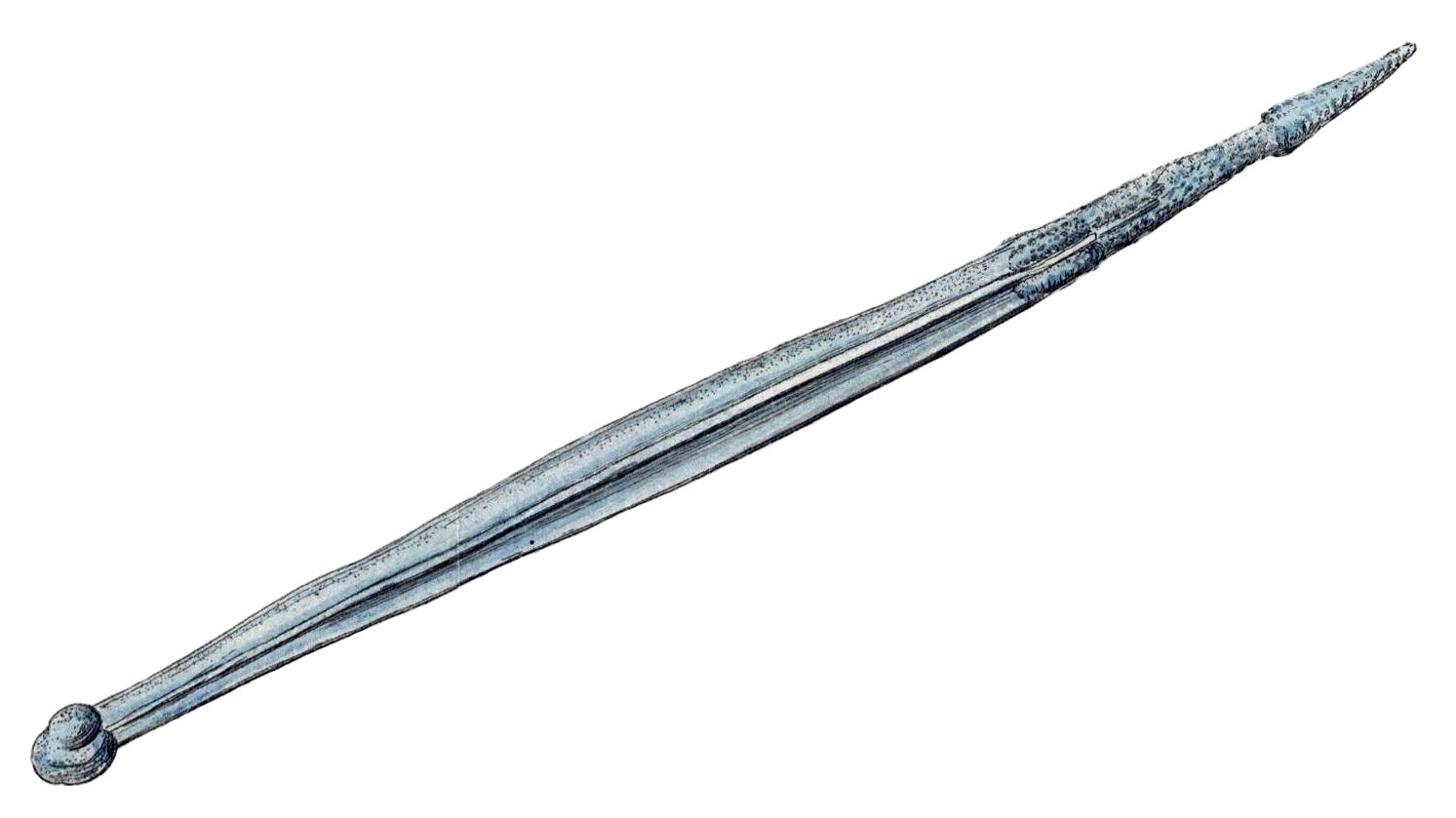

Scientific classification
- Kingdom: Animalia
- Phylum: Chaetognatha
- Class: Sagittoidea
- Order: Aphragmophora
- Family: Sagittidae
- Genus: Parasagitta
- Species: P. setosa

Binomial name
- Parasagitta setosa (Müller, 1847)

Synonyms
- Sagitta batava (Biersteker & van der Spoel, 1966); Sagitta euxina Moltschanoff, 1909; Sagitta setosa J. Müller, 1847

= Parasagitta setosa =

Species of marine worm

Parasagitta setosa, the coastal arrow worm, is a small arrow worm in the family Sagittidae, previously referred to as Sagitta setosa. It is native to the northeastern Atlantic Ocean, the North Sea and the Mediterranean Sea, and also occurs in the Baltic Sea and the Black Sea.

== Description ==
Parasagitta setosa grows to a maximum length of 14 mm (0.55 in), its tail being up to a quarter of this length. It is a thin, transparent, flexible worm with two pairs of rounded lateral fins composed completely of ray-like structures. There are eight to nine curved grasping hooks on the head. The teeth are in two rows, with six to eight in the front row and ten to sixteen at the back. The eyes have a star-shaped segment spot and the collarette is small or not present at all. The seminal vesicles are very near the posterior fins which are separated from the caudal fin.

== Distribution ==
Parasagitta setosa is a common neritic species forming part of the plankton in waters less than about 200 metres deep. It occurs in the northeastern Atlantic Ocean, the North Sea, the Mediterranean Sea and the Black Sea. It is the most common arrow worm in the North Sea and Black Sea, occurring in great drifts in July and August in the Black Sea and from September to November in the North Sea. It is also found in the Baltic Sea when influxes of saline water flow in from the Kattegat.

== Ecology ==
Parasagitta setosa is one of a number of marine animals that make large vertical migrations on a daily basis. During the day it is found in deep waters but in the late afternoon or early evening it rises to the upper waters, usually spending the night just below the thermocline, and descending again to the depths in early morning.

Parasagitta setosa is abundant in many pelagic waters and is an important part of the food chain. It is a predator and consumes about 85% of its bodyweight each day. It feeds on copepods, Oikopleura and smaller P. setosa. It is itself consumed by larger organisms such as the comb jelly Pleurobrachia pileus.

The abundance in any area of P. setosa and other mezo-zooplankton, can be easily disturbed by the introduction of an alien species. The arrival of the siphonophore Muggiaea atlantica in the North Sea and of the comb jelly Mnemiopsis leidyi in the Black Sea in the 1980s both had dramatic effects. In the Black Sea, the population of the once abundant P. setosa plummeted, and the anchovy stocks collapsed. The explosive population rises of the invasive species slowed when the animals they fed on became depleted, and afterwards there were wild swings in the populations of these species as a balance of predators and prey developed.
