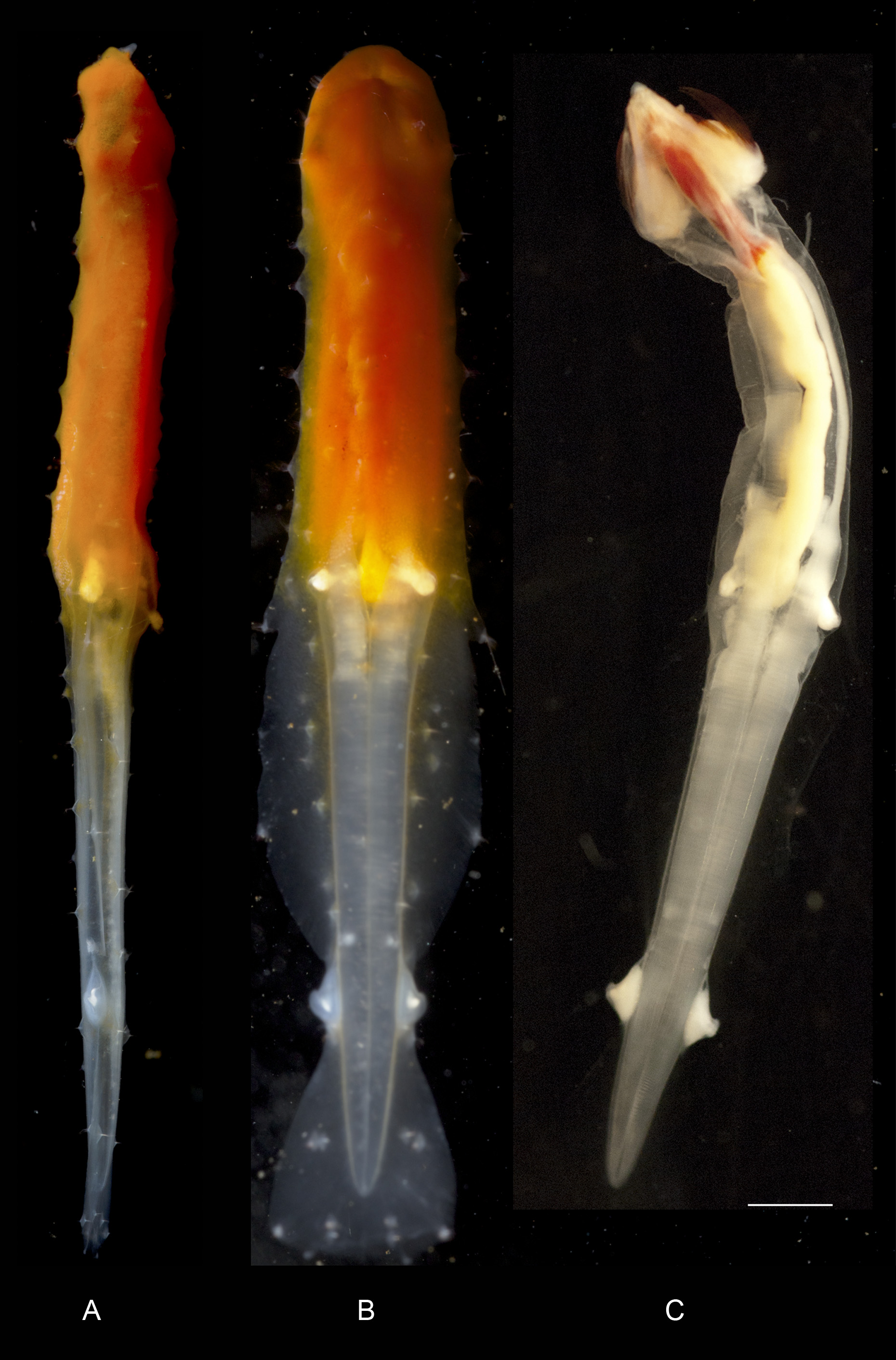
- Archeterokrohnia docrickettsae holotype. A, lateral view; B, dorsal view; C, dorsal view, after 4 months preservation. Scale bar: 2 mm.

Scientific classification
- Kingdom: Animalia
- Phylum: Chaetognatha
- Class: Sagittoidea
- Order: Phragmophora
- Family: Heterokrohniidae
- Genus: Archeterokrohnia; Casanova, 1986

= Archeterokrohnia =

Genus of marine worms

Archeterokrohnia is a genus of chaetognaths in the family Heterokrohniidae.The total body length excluding tail fin 28.5; the tail section is 55.2% of the tail fin; head blunt when hooded, triangular after preservation, head with 3.5 mm. Furthermore, the eyes are absent, the trunk section is orange throughout in life, and the organism exists around 3200 m below sea level.

== Species ==
- Archeterokrohnia docrickettsae Thuesen & Haddock, 2013
- Archeterokrohnia longicaudata (Hagen & Kapp, 1986)
- Archeterokrohnia palpifera Casanova, 1986
- Archeterokrohnia rubra Casanova, 1986
