= Biphragmosagittidae =

Scientific classification
- Domain: Eukaryota
- Kingdom: Animalia
- Phylum: Chaetognatha
- Class: Sagittoidea
- Order: Biphragmosagittiformes
- Family: Biphragmosagittidae; Kassatkina, 2011

Family of marine worms

Biphragmosagittidae is a family of worms belonging to the order Biphragmosagittiformes.

Genera:

- Biphragmofastigata Kassatkina, 2011
- Biphragmosagitta Kassatkina, 2011
