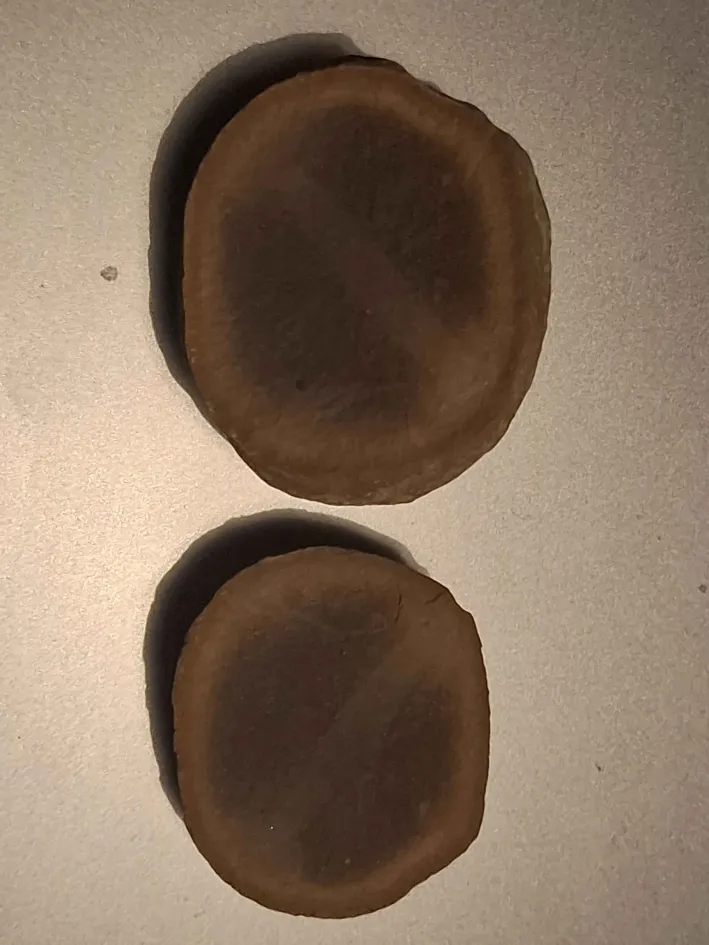
- Paucijaculum samamithion specimen from Mazon Creek Pit 11

Scientific classification
- Kingdom: Animalia
- Phylum: Chaetognatha
- Genus: †Paucijaculum; Schram, 1973
- Species: †P. samamithion

Binomial name
- †Paucijaculum samamithion Schram, 1973

= Paucijaculum =

Paucijaculum Temporal range: Moscovian, ~311–307 Ma

Cambrian genus of chaetognath

Paucijaculum is an extinct genus of chaetognath from the Carboniferous age Francis Creek Shale and Carbondale Group of Illinois, United States. It contains one species, Paucijaculum samamithion.

== Discovery and naming ==
The holotype is FMNH PE116 and it was discovered no later than 1972 inside an ironstone concretion at Pit 11 at Mazon Creek. Schram (1973) named and described Paucijaculum samamithion as the oldest known and first known fossil chaetognath; this was accepted until Eognathacantha was identified from the Cambrian Stage 3 in China.

Additional specimens have been found in the Carbondale Group near Essex, Illinois.

== Description ==
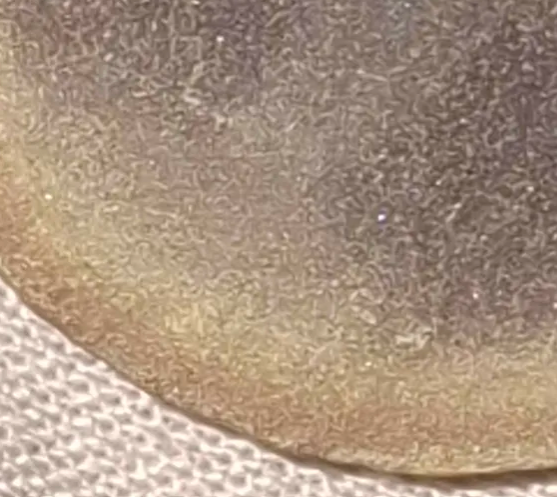
Closeup of the rounded tail fin of Paucijaculum samamithion

Paucijaculum grew up to 3 centimetres (1.2 in) long and had incipiently developed fins alongside a circular tail fin.

Most specimens are poorly preserved and lack detail.
