= Pterosagitta =

Scientific classification
- Kingdom: Animalia
- Phylum: Chaetognatha
- Class: Sagittoidea
- Order: Aphragmophora
- Family: Pterosagittidae; Tokioka, 1965
- Genus: Pterosagitta; Costa, 1869
- Species: P. draco

Binomial name
- Pterosagitta draco (Krohn, 1853)

Family of marine worms

Pterosagittidae is a family of sagittoideans in the order Aphragmophora. It consists of a single genus, Pterosagitta Costa, 1869, which consists of a single species, Pterosagitta draco (Krohn, 1853).
