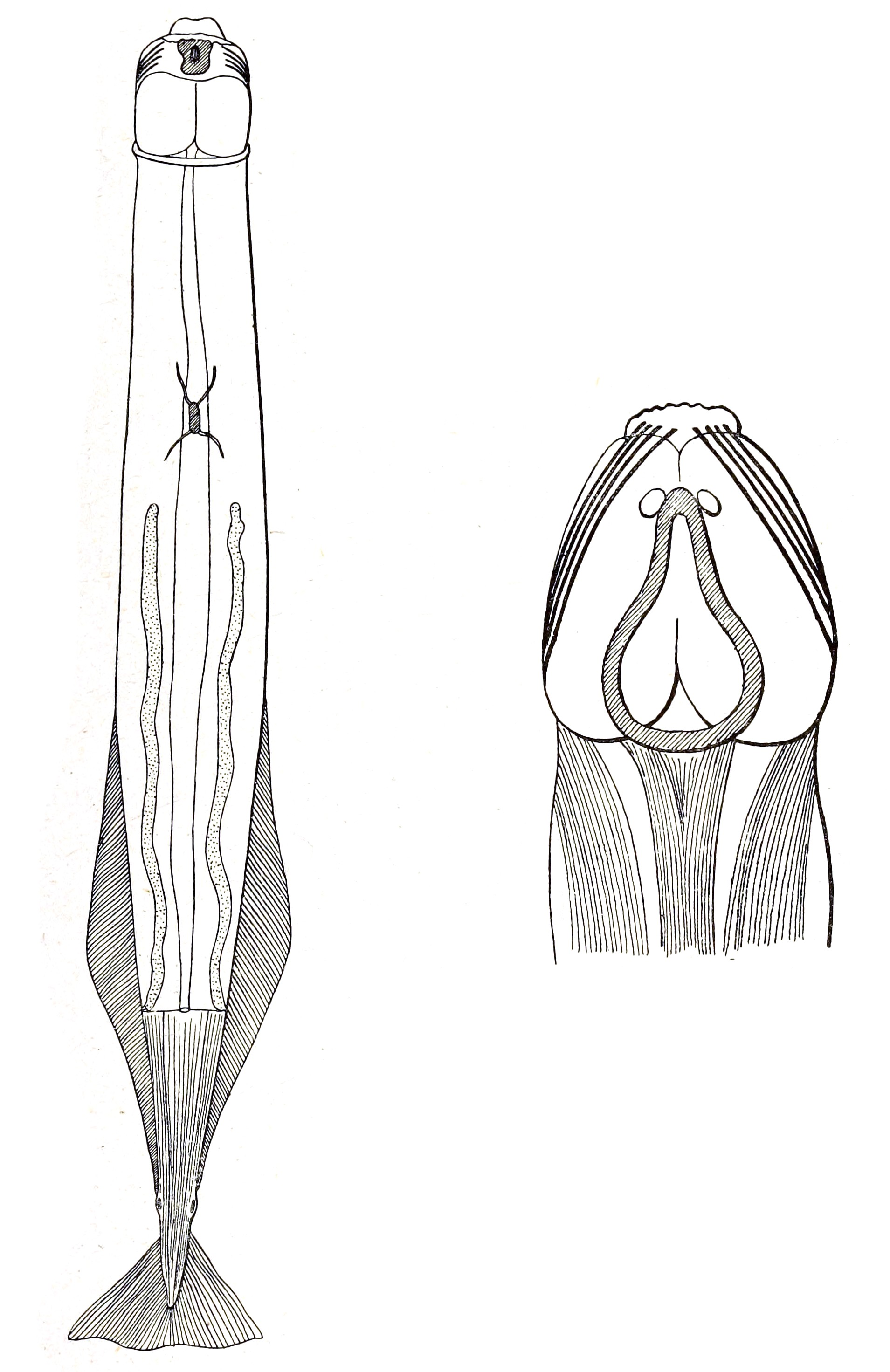
- Krohnittella boureei

Scientific classification
- Kingdom: Animalia
- Phylum: Chaetognatha
- Class: Sagittoidea
- Order: Phragmophora
- Family: Krohnittellidae; Bieri, 1989
- Genus: Krohnittella; Germain & Joubin, 1912

= Krohnittella =

Family of marine worms

Krohnittellidae is a family of sagittoideans in the order Phragmophora. It consists of one genus, Krohnittella Germain & Joubin, 1912.

== Species ==
- Krohnittella boureei Germain & Joubin, 1912
- Krohnittella tokiokai Bieri, 1974
