= Pterokrohnia =

Scientific classification
- Kingdom: Animalia
- Phylum: Chaetognatha
- Class: Sagittoidea
- Order: Aphragmophora
- Family: Pterokrohniidae; Bieri, 1991
- Genus: Pterokrohnia; Srinivasan, 1986
- Species: P. arabica

Binomial name
- Pterokrohnia arabica Srinivasan, 1986

Family of marine worms

Pterokrohniidae is a family of sagittoideans in the order Aphragmophora. It consists of a single genus, Pterokrohnia Srinivasan, 1986, which consists of a single species, Pterokrohnia arabica Srinavasan, 1986.
