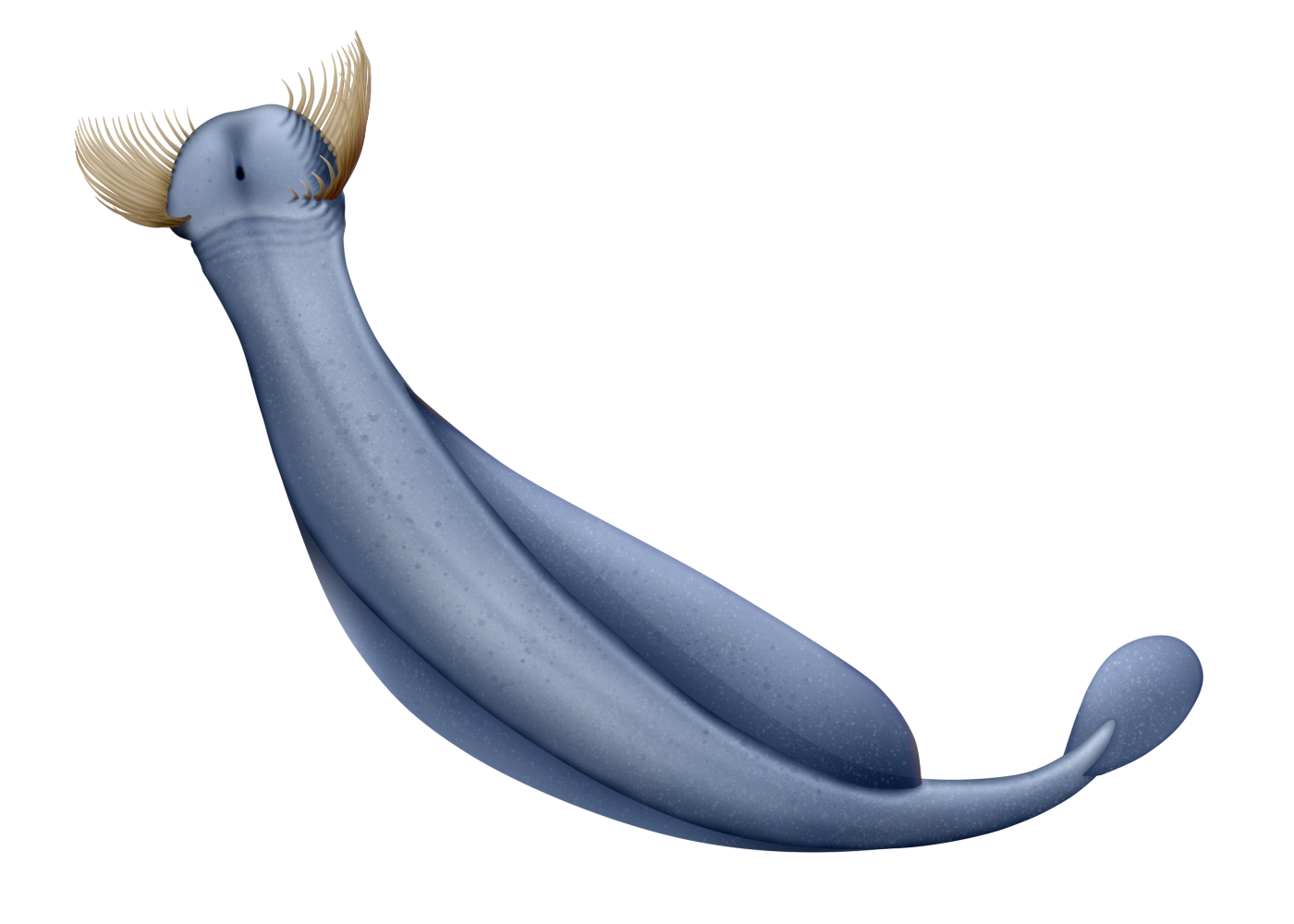
- A reconstruction of Capinatator praetermissus

Scientific classification
- Kingdom: Animalia
- Phylum: Chaetognatha
- Genus: †Capinatator
- Species: †C. praetermissus

Binomial name
- †Capinatator praetermissus Briggs and Caron, 2017

= Capinatator =

Capinatator Temporal range: Cambrian (Wuliuan)

Cambrian genus of chaetognath

Capinatator praetermissus is an extinct arrow worm from the Burgess Shale lagerstätte.

== Description ==
Capinatator has an unusually large amount of spines in its jaw apparatus, with over 25 on each half. These spines are arranged in arcs like modern chaetognaths, although unlike the modern types no posterior or anterior teeth are observed. The body tapers anteriorly and posteriorly, but unlike all modern arrow worms except the atypical Bathybelos, a neck is observed separating the head and trunk. The tail is very small, with the anus almost at the posterior end. Unusually no fins are known, although they likely decayed prior to fossilisation. A dark line is preserved running down the middle of the animal, likely the pharynx and intestine. Thin fibres oriented lengthwise along the body are interpreted as remnants of longitudinal muscles, and poorly defined dark areas near the tail are likely ovaries. The amount of spines in the apparatus seemingly increases with size, as the smallest specimens only have around five on each side. A possible hood is also preserved, however this is unclear. The body is roughly 10 centimetres (3.9 in) long, placing it as one of the largest known chaetognaths alongside Pseudosagitta gazellae. (While claims of 15 centimetres (5.9 in) long chaetognaths have been recorded, these are uncited)

== Palaeobiology ==
The strengthened tips of its spines likely helped capture prey, which was enclosed by the two halves of the apparatus moving together. Its large size likely represents a stage before chaetognaths became planktonic, with them starting out as large nektonic predators. In addition, the lack of any teeth suggests these are a derived trait, possibly evolved from some of the numerous spines due to their near-identical composition in modern arrow worms. The lack of transverse muscles and small tail suggests Capinatator was likely pelagic.

== Etymology ==
The genus name Capinatator derives from the Latin words capio (“to grasp”) and natator (“swimmer”) in reference to its predatory nature. The species name praetermissus translates to “overlooked” in reference to the length of time between discovery and naming, with some specimens having been discovered over 30 years prior.
