= August David Krohn =

August David Krohn (1803–1891) was a Saint Petersburg born zoologist of German origin. He was the son of Abraham Krohn, the founder of Russia's first brewery, who had left the island of Rügen to serve in the court of Catherine the Great. He was the uncle of the fennoman folklorist Julius Krohn. According to legend, Krohn is said to have left for Central Europe after losing to his younger brother Leopold the competition for the hand of a Vyborg mansion owner's 15-year-old daughter. He remained unmarried until his death at the age of 88.

Krohn worked at the University of Bonn on zoology, anatomy and embryology. He was a pioneer in marine biology and published essential works on Chaetognatha (Arrow Worms) in 1844 & 1853. He was in correspondence with Charles Darwin and is said to have pointed out errors in Darwin's work in his thesis. The genus and species identified by him are marked with the author abbreviation Krohn. He was the first to classify the phylum Rhombozoa of the kingdom Animalia.

The species Euphausia krohnii and Cliopsis krohnii and the family Eukrohniidae are named after him.

== Publications ==
=== Books ===
- Krohn, Augustus Davides (1826). De iridodialysis operatione instrumentisque in ea adhibendis : Dissertatio ophthalmologica inauguralis ... (Doctoral thesis) (in Latin). Berlin: Typis Academiæ Regiæ Scientiarum. OCLC 16066369.
- Krohn, August David (1844). Anatomisch-physiologische Bebachtungen über die Sagitta bipuncta. Hamburg: Nestler & Melle.
- Krohn, August David (1849). Beitrag zur Entwicklungsgeschichte der Seeigellarven (35, [1] p.: 2 plates; 27 cm). Heidelberg: Julius Groos. "Sea urchins"
- Krohn, A (1860). Beiträge zur Entwicklungsgeschichte der Pteropoden und Heteropoden (1-45, 2 pls.). Leipzig: Engelmann.

=== Journals ===
- Krohn, A (1845). "Ueber einen neuen cephalopoden (Octopodoteuthis)". Archiv für Naturgeschichte. 11: 47–49.
- Krohn, A (1847). "Nachtrage zu den Aufsatzen uber Tiedemannia, Octopodoteuthis und Alciopa., 13. ". Archiv für Naturgeschichte. 13: 36–40.
- Krohn, August David (January 1847). "Observations sur deux nouveaux genres de Gastéropodes (Lobiger et Lophocercus)". Annales des Sciences Naturelles. Tome VII (In 8°): 52–60.
- Krohn, A (1860). "Über die Schale der Larven des Gasteropteron Meckelii". Archiv für Naturgeschichte: 64–68.
- Krohn, August (1837). "Ueber das Auge der lebendiggebährenden Sumpfschnecke (Paludina vivipara)". Archiv für Anatomie, Physiologie und wissenschaftliche Medicin: 479–485.
- Krohn, August (1837). "Ueber die Structur der Iris der Vögel und ihren Bewegungsmechanismus". Archiv für Anatomie, Physiologie und wissenschaftliche Medicin: 357–380.
- Krohn, August (1839). "Ueber das Nervensystem des Sipunculus nudus". Archiv für Anatomie, Physiologie und wissenschaftliche Medicin: 348–352.
- Krohn, August (1839). "Fernerer Beitrag zur Kenntniss des Schneckenauges". Archiv für Anatomie, Physiologie und wissenschaftliche Medicin: 332–337.
- Krohn, August (1839). "Ueber das wasserführende System einiger Cephalopoden". Archiv für Anatomie, Physiologie und wissenschaftliche Medicin: 353–359.
- Krohn, August (1840). "Ueber augenähnliche Organe bei Pecten und Spondylus". Archiv für Anatomie, Physiologie und wissenschaftliche Medicin: 371–386.
- Krohn, August (1841). "Ueber die Anordnung des Nervensystems der Echiniden und Holothurien im Allgemeinen". Archiv für Anatomie, Physiologie und wissenschaftliche Medicin: 1–13.
- Krohn, August (1842). "Ueber den Sternapsis thalassemoides". Archiv für Anatomie, Physiologie und wissenschaftliche Medicin: 426–432.
- Krohn, August (1842). "Ueber den Vertumnus tethidicola". Archiv für Anatomie, Physiologie und wissenschaftliche Medicin: 418–423.
- Krohn, August (1843). "Einige Bemerkungen und Beobachtungen über die Geschlechtsverhältnisse bei den Sertularinen". Archiv für Anatomie, Physiologie und wissenschaftliche Medicin: 174–181.
- Krohn, August (1851). "Ueber die Larve des Sinpunculus nudus, nebst vorausgeschickten Bemerkungen über die Sexualverhältnisse der Sipunculiden". Archiv für Anatomie, Physiologie und wissenschaftliche Medicin: 368–379.
- Krohn, August (1851). "Ueber die Entwickelung einer lebendig gebärenden Ophiure: Briefliche Mittheilung an den Herausgeber". Archiv für Anatomie, Physiologie und wissenschaftliche Medicin: 338–343.
- Krohn, August (1851). "Beobachtungen aus der Entwickelungsgeschichte der Holothurien und Seeigel: Briefliche Mittheilung an den Herausgeber". Archiv für Anatomie, Physiologie und wissenschaftliche Medicin: 344–352.
- Krohn, August (1852). "Ueber die Entwickelung der Ascidien". Archiv für Anatomie, Physiologie und wissenschaftliche Medicin: 312–333.
- Krohn, August (1853). "Ueber einige niedere Thiere: Briefliche Mittheilung an den Herausgeber". Archiv für Anatomie, Physiologie und wissenschaftliche Medicin: 137–141.
- Krohn, August (1853). "Ueber die Lehre von Spatangus purpureus". Archiv für Anatomie, Physiologie und wissenschaftliche Medicin: 255–259.
- Krohn, August (1853). "Ueber die Brut des Cladonema radiatum und deren Entwickelung zum Stauridium". Archiv für Anatomie, Physiologie und wissenschaftliche Medicin: 420–426.
- Krohn, August (1853). "Ueber die Entwickelung der Seesterne und Holothurien". Archiv für Anatomie, Physiologie und wissenschaftliche Medicin: 317–321.
- Krohn, August (1853). "Ueber die Larve des Echinus brevispinosus". Archiv für Anatomie, Physiologie und wissenschaftliche Medicin: 361–364.
- Krohn, August (1854). "Beobachtungen über Echinodermenlarven". Archiv für Anatomie, Physiologie und wissenschaftliche Medicin: 208–213.
- Krohn, August (1855). "Ueber die frühesten Entwickelungsstufen der Pelagia noctiluca". Archiv für Anatomie, Physiologie und wissenschaftliche Medicin: 491–497.
- Krohn, August (1855). "Ueber die Sprösslinge von Autoglytus prolifera Gr". Archiv für Anatomie, Physiologie und wissenschaftliche Medicin: 489–490.
- Krohn, August (1856). "Beobachtungen aus der Entwickelungsgeschichte der Pteropoden und Echinodermen: Briefliche Mittheilung an den Herausgeber". Archiv für Anatomie, Physiologie und wissenschaftliche Medicin: 515–522.
- Krohn, August (1857). "Beobachtungen aus der Entwicklungsgeschichte der Pteropoden und Heteropoden: Briefliche Mittheilung an den Herausgeber". Archiv für Anatomie, Physiologie und wissenschaftliche Medicin: 459–468.
- Krohn, August (1857). "Ueber einen neuen Entwicklungsmodus der Ophiuren". Archiv für Anatomie, Physiologie und wissenschaftliche Medicin: 369–375.
- Krohn, August (1858). "Über Pilidium und Actinotrocha". Archiv für Anatomie, Physiologie und wissenschaftliche Medicin: 289–301.
- Krohn, August; Anton Schneide (1867). "Ueber Annelidlarven mit porösen Hüllen". Archiv für Anatomie, Physiologie und wissenschaftliche Medicin: 498–508.

== See also ==
- Johann Friedrich von Brandt
