= Wilhelm Ferdinand Erichson =

German entomologist and doctor (1809–1848)

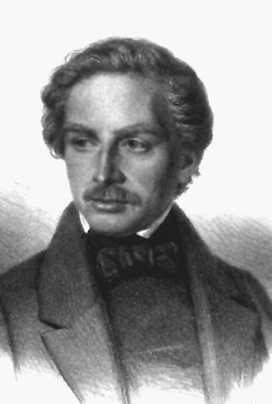
Wilhelm Ferdinand Erichson

Wilhelm Ferdinand Erichson (26 November 1809 – 18 December 1848) was a German entomologist and medical doctor.

He was the author of many articles about insects mainly in Archiv für Naturgeschichte. When writing in Latin, he latinised Wilhelm to Guillelmus becoming either Guil. F. Erichson or G.F. Erichson. He wrote a paper in 1842 on insect species collected at Woolnorth in Tasmania, Australia, which was the first detailed research published on the biogeography of Australian animals and was very influential in raising scientific interest in Australian fauna.

Erichson was the curator of the Coleoptera collections at the Museum fur Naturkunde in Berlin from 1834 to 1848. Erichson's Scarabaeidae classification is nearly identical to the modern one.

== Works ==
- Genera Dytiscorum. Berlin (1832)
- Die Käfer der Mark Brandenburg. Two volumes Berlin (1837-1839) Click for pdf:
- Genera et species Staphylinorum insectorum. Berlin 1839-1840)
- Entomographien. Berlin (1840)
- 1839: IX. Insecten. Archiv für Naturgeschichte 5(2): 281–375. PDF
- 1842: Beitrag zur Insecten-Fauna von Vandiemensland, mit besonderer Berücksichtigung der geographischen Verbreitung der Insecten. Archiv für Naturgeschichte 8: 83-287. PDF
- Bericht über die wissenschaftlichen Leistungen auf dem Gebiete der Entomologie. Berlin (1838)
- Naturgeschichte der Insecten Deutschlands. Berlin (1845-1848)
