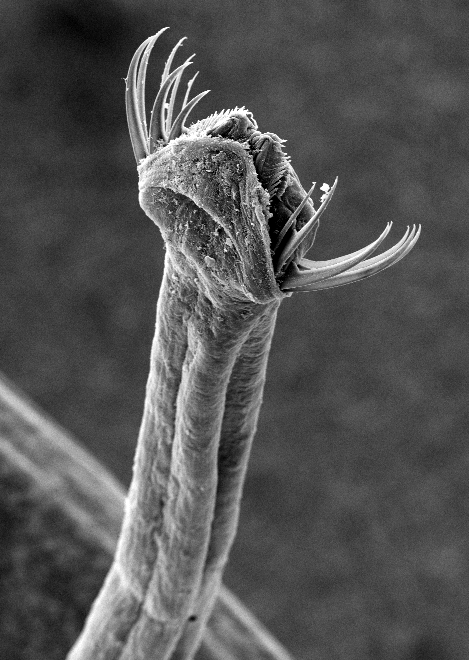
- Sagitta sp.

Scientific classification
- Domain: Eukaryota
- Kingdom: Animalia
- Phylum: Chaetognatha
- Class: Sagittoidea
- Order: Aphragmophora
- Family: Sagittidae
- Genus: Sagitta; Quoy & Gaimard, 1827

Species
- See text

Synonyms
- Abaciasagitta

= Sagitta (arrowworm) =

Genus of marine worms

Sagitta is a genus of Chaetognatha, a phylum commonly known as arrowworms or arrow worms. Phylum Chaetognatha comprises small marine worms.

This genus is characterized in part by the distribution of the cilia on the body, the thick rays in the fins, and hooks which are not serrated.

As of 2007 there are 15 species. More have since been described.

Species include:

- Sagitta abyssicola
- Sagitta bedoti
- Sagitta bipunctata – Commons
- Sagitta bruuni
- Sagitta euneritica
- Sagitta euxina
- Sagitta glacialis
  - S. g. baltica
  - S. g. glacialis
- Sagitta izuensis
- Sagitta kussakini
- Sagitta modesta
- Sagitta nagae
- Sagitta nutana
- Sagitta pulchra
- Sagitta sceptrum
- Sagitta setosa
- Sagitta sublica
