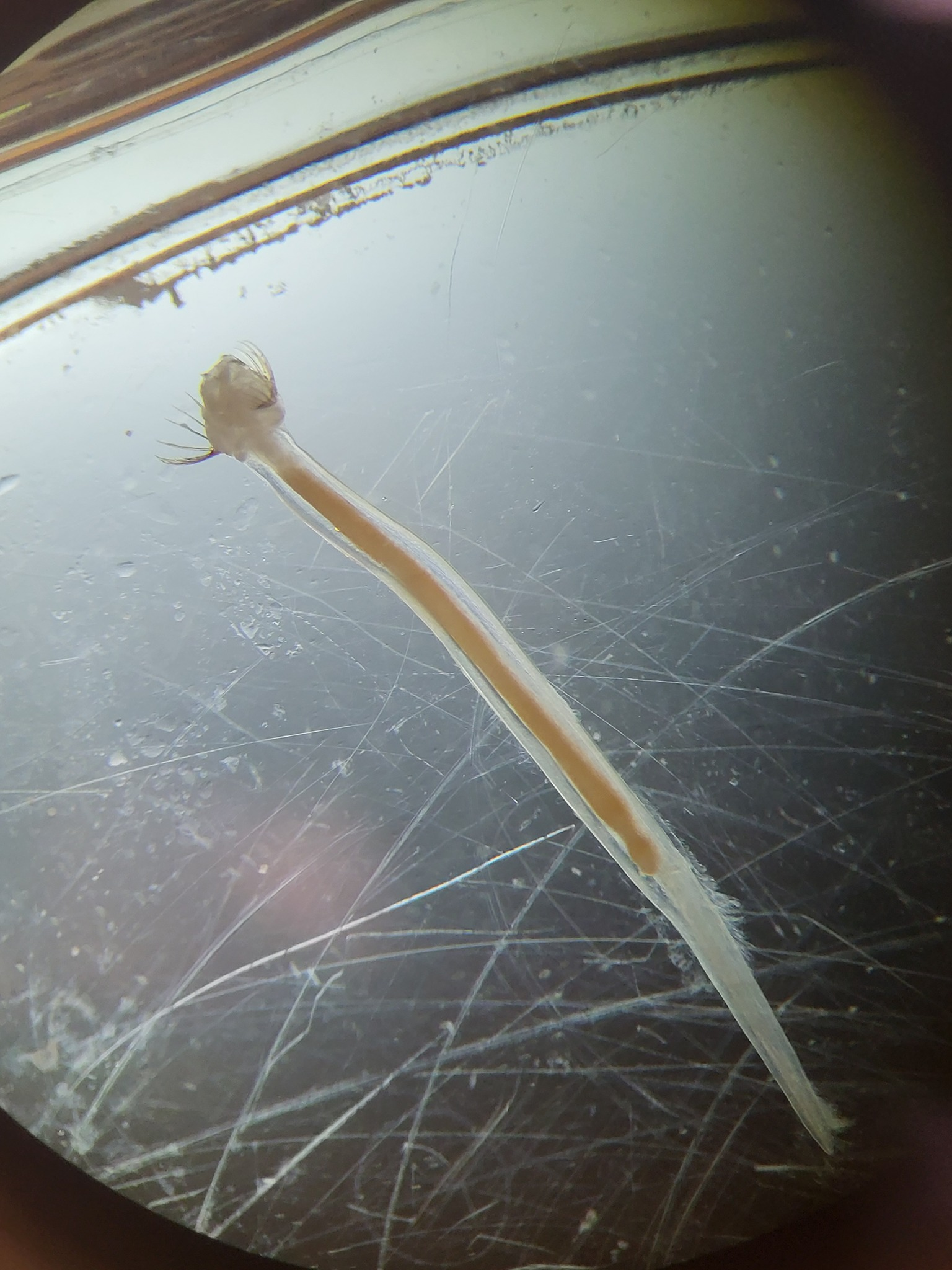

Scientific classification
- Domain: Eukaryota
- Kingdom: Animalia
- Phylum: Chaetognatha
- Class: Sagittoidea
- Order: Aphragmophora
- Family: Sagittidae
- Genus: Caecosagitta; Tokioka, 1965
- Species: C. macrocephala

Binomial name
- Caecosagitta macrocephala (Fowler, 1904)

= Caecosagitta =

Species of worm

Caecosagitta macrocephala is a deep sea marine chaetognath that is distributed in meso- and bathypelagic layers. It has a very wide distribution that ranges from the Subantarctic to Subarctic Ocean. Cecosagitta macrocephalas have large heads, hence their name “macro-cephala”. Within their eyes are photoreceptive regions that allow them to catch weak light at bathypelagic depths. Along with their eyes, their gut or intestine has orange pigmentation and a luminous organ that gleams due to bioluminescence unlike some other species of Sagittidae. To be more precise, the luminescent organ is located on the ventral edge of each anterior lateral fin. It is the only member of the genus Caecosagitta, and only one of the two known species of bioluminescent chaetognath, the other being the distantly related Eukrohnia fowleri. C. macrocephala has a secreted bioluminescence that is thought to be coelenterazine based. The luciferase is highly unstable, being unable to survive a single freeze-thaw, and is rapidly inactivated at ice-cold temperatures.

Caecosagitta macrocephala's bioluminescent organs consist of hexagonal chambers containing elongate ovoid particles—the organelles holding bioluminescent materials. No other luminous organism is known to use hexagonal packing to hold bioluminescent materials.

Caecosagitta macrocephala found in the north-western Pacific and centre-east to south Atlantic Oceans, were found to consists of at least two cryptic species due to "speciation of the bathypelagic species from a mesopelagic precursor."
