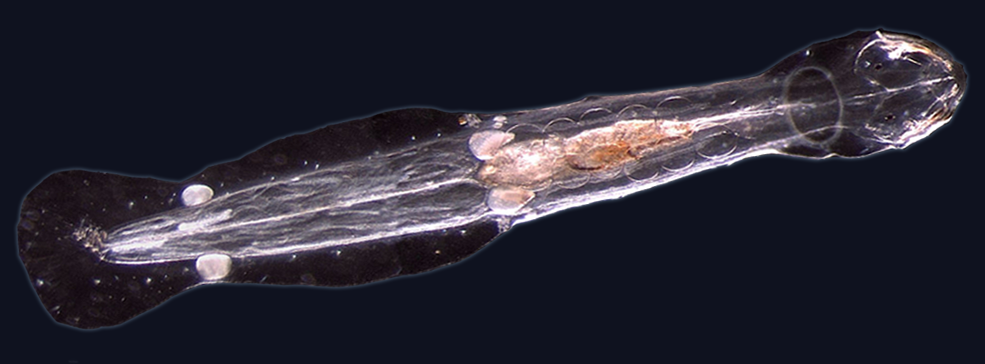
- Spadella cephaloptera

Scientific classification
- Kingdom: Animalia
- Phylum: Chaetognatha
- Class: Sagittoidea
- Order: Phragmophora
- Family: Spadellidae
- Genus: Spadella; Langerhans, 1880

= Spadella =

Genus of worms

Spadella is a genus of small, transparent marine invertebrates belonging to the family Spadellidae within the phylum Chaetognatha, commonly known as arrow worms. Unlike most chaetognaths, which are pelagic (free-swimming in open water), species of Spadella are benthic, meaning they live near the seafloor and often attach to substrates in shallow marine environments.

The first recorded observation of a Spadella species was made by Busch in 1851, when Spadella cephaloptera was first reported. However, the genus itself was formally described by Langerhans in 1880, and currently includes several recognized species.

Spadella species play an important role in marine food webs, preying on copepods and other planktonic organisms. They have also been of scientific interest due to their unique evolutionary traits, particularly in the context of bilaterian phylogeny and Hox gene organization, which has led to debates on the evolutionary origins of chaetognaths.

== Taxonomy & Classification ==
Spadella is a genus within the phylum Chaetognatha (arrow worms), class Sagittoidea, order Phragmophora, and family Spadellidae. The genus was first described by Paul Langerhans in 1880, with its type species, Spadella cephaloptera, originally identified as Sagitta cephaloptera by Wilhelm Busch in 1851 before being reclassified.

Within Spadellidae, Spadella is distinguished from other genera by the absence of adhesive organs, a characteristic found in some related genera, such as Paraspadella. This distinction played a key role in taxonomic revisions that led to the separation of Spadella from other chaetognaths.

=== Species Groups ===
Historically, Spadella and sister-species have been categorized into three morphological groups based on fin structure and the presence or absence of adhesive organs:

1. Schizoptera-group (Paraspadella): Species in this group have two pairs of lateral fins and prominent adhesive organs on the tail (type species: Paraspadella schizoptera Conant, 1895).
2. Cephalotera-group (Spadella): Species in this group have only one pair of lateral fins and lack adhesive organs (type species: Spadella cephaloptera Busch, 1851).
3. Puchella-group (Gephyrospadella): These species are intermediate between the Schizoptera and Cephalotera groups, possessing one pair of lateral fins and differentiated adhesive organs (type species: Gephyrospadella pulchella Owre, 1963).

These species groupings were historically based on morphological traits, but modern molecular studies may lead to further taxonomic revisions.

As of current taxonomic records, the genus Spadella includes multiple recognized species, with Spadella cephaloptera designated as the type species.

== Morphology & Description ==
Species within the genus Spadella are small, transparent marine invertebrates, typically ranging from 3–10 mm in length. The body is elongated and divided into three distinct sections: the head, trunk, and tail.

=== Fins and Locomotion ===
Most species of Spadella have one pair of lateral fins along the trunk, aiding in stability and movement. A caudal fin is located at the posterior end, contributing to propulsion. Spadella species are benthic and rely less on swimming, often attaching to substrates in shallow marine environments. Unlike some benthic chaetognaths, however, Spadella lacks specialized adhesive organs. Instead, it relies on mucus secretion, passive buoyancy control, and body positioning to remain close to the substrate; these adaptations permit Spadella to stay within structured environments such as seagrass beds and rocky crevices without needing active adhesion.

=== Head & Sensory Features ===
The head is rounded and lacks the grasping spines found in many pelagic chaetognaths. Instead, Spadella uses simple eyes, sensory bristles, and ciliary structures to detect prey movements.

=== Digestive System ===
The digestive tract is simple and visible through their transparent body. The mouth is ventral and leads into a muscular pharynx, which assists in food processing. Unlike other chaetognaths, Spadella lacks true jaws, instead using cilia and mucus to capture small prey.

=== Differences from Other Chaetognaths ===
Spadella differs from other chaetognaths in several key ways:

- Benthic lifestyle – Unlike pelagic chaetognaths, it spends most of its life on the seafloor.
- Lack of adhesive organs – A key distinction from related genera such as Paraspadella.
- Simplified musculature and nervous system compared to free-swimming chaetognaths.

== Habitat & Distribution ==
Spadella species are benthic marine invertebrates, primarily inhabiting shallow coastal waters worldwide. Unlike pelagic chaetognaths that drift in the open ocean, Spadella species are typically found on or near the seafloor, where they attach to various substrates. Their distribution is strongly influenced by habitat availability, environmental stability, and water quality.

=== Geographic Range ===
Spadella species have been recorded in temperate and tropical coastal regions, including the Mediterranean Sea, the Atlantic Ocean, and parts of the Pacific. Different species exhibit varying levels of endemism, with some being widely distributed, while others are restricted to specific marine habitats.

For example:

- Spadella valsalinae is endemic to the Adriatic Sea.
- Spadella cephaloptera, the most well-known species, has a broader distribution across European and North African coastal waters.

=== Preferred Habitats ===
Most Spadella species inhabit: seagrass beds (such as Posidonia oceanica meadows), rocky substrates where they attach to crevices, sandy and muddy sediments often burrowing for shelter, and shallow reef environments, where they remain partially hidden among corals or algae. Spadella rely on substrate association to maintain their position in the water column.

=== Depth Range ===
Most Spadella species are found in:

- Intertidal zones to 10 meters depth, often attached to seagrass and algae.
- Some species may extend to 20-30 meters, depending on habitat stability.
- They are rarely found in deep-sea environments, unlike some other chaetognaths.

Their preferences for shallow, coastal waters makes them vulnerable to habitat degradation, pollution, and climate change-induced alterations in marine ecosystems.

=== Environmental Sensitivities ===
Due to their benthic and stationary nature, Spadella species are highly sensitive to environmental changes, including:

- Water temperature fluctuations
- Salinity variations
- Pollution levels, including chemical runoff and microplastics
- Habitat destruction, such as loss of seagrass beds due to coastal development

Some researchers suggest that Spadella could serve as a bioindicator species for assessing coastal marine ecosystem health.

== Feeding & Ecology ==
=== Feeding Behaviour ===
Spadella species are carnivorous, primarily preying on small planktonic organisms such as copepods, larval crustaceans, and other microscopic marine invertebrates. Unlike their pelagic relatives, which actively swim in pursuit of prey, Spadella utilize a sit-and-wait predation strategy. They anchor themselves to a substrate using mucus secretions and rely on their rapid reflexes to capture passing prey.

Prey capture first involves sensory detection through specialized ciliary structures and mechanoreceptors located on the head. Once the prey is detected, Spadella uses rapid body contractions to lunge forward, engulfing the target using its muscular pharynx. As they lack grasping spines, Spadella instead relies on ciliary action and mucus to entrap food.

=== Trophic Role in Marine Ecosystems ===
As benthic predators, Spadella species play a crucial role in regulating plankton populations within shallow coastal ecosystems. Their feeding activity helps control copepod and larval crustacean densities, which in turn influences nutrient cycling and energy transfer in marine food webs.

Spadella are also an important food source for higher trophic levels, including small benthic fish and invertebrate predators such as polychaetes and amphipods. Their transparency and cryptic behaviour help reduce predation risk, but they are still vulnerable to predatory pressure from larger marine organisms.

== Reproduction & Development ==
=== Reproductive Strategy ===
Spadella species are hermaphroditic, meaning individuals possess both male and female reproductive organs. As in other chaetognaths, reproduction typically involves reciprocal sperm exchange during mating, allowing for internal fertilization. Once fertilized, eggs are subsequently deposited on nearby substrates such as seagrass, sand, or rocky surfaces.

Some studies suggest that Spadella exhibits seasonal reproductive cycles, with higher reproductive activity during warmer months when food availability is greater. This pattern is consistent with other benthic marine invertebrates that rely on stable environmental conditions for successful embryonic development.

=== Egg Deposition & Embryonic Development ===
Fertilized eggs are laid in small clusters attached to substrates via mucus secretions. The number of eggs per clutch varies among species, but Spadella generally produces fewer eggs than pelagic chaetognaths, likely due to the increased survival rates of benthic embryos.

Embryonic development in Spadella follows a direct development pathway, meaning larvae hatch as miniature versions of adults rather than undergoing a planktonic larval stage. This is in contrast to many marine invertebrates that have planktonic larvae for dispersal. Direct development is an adaptation to their benthic lifestyle, reducing predation risk in the open water.

=== Growth & Juvenile Development ===
Newly hatched Spadella juveniles resemble adults but are initially smaller and less developed. Their nervous system and musculature continue to mature after hatching, with locomotion and feeding behaviors becoming more refined as they grow. Research suggests that neurodevelopment in Spadella hatchlings is relatively simple compared to pelagic chaetognaths, possibly reflecting differences in lifestyle and mobility requirements.

Growth rates depend on temperature and food availability, with warmer waters accelerating development. Juveniles reach sexual maturity within a few weeks to months, depending on species and environmental conditions.

== Evolutionary Significance & Phylogeny ==
Chaetognaths, including species within the genus Spadella, have long puzzled evolutionary biologists due to their combination of features seen in both protostomes and deuterostomes. Spadella has become a particularly important genus for exploring these questions because of its basal characteristics and accessible benthic forms.

=== Phylogenetic Placement of Chaetognaths ===
Historically, the phylum Chaetognatha was difficult to classify due to its mix of traits. Molecular studies, including analyses of small-subunit ribosomal RNA and mitochondrial genes, have produced conflicting results—some placing chaetognaths within protostomes (alongside annelids and mollusks), while others suggest a closer relationship to deuterostomes (like echinoderms and chordates).

Telford and Holland (2004) provided evidence supporting deep divergence between chaetognaths and other bilaterians, indicating they may represent an early-branching lineage within bilaterians rather than fitting neatly into either major group.

=== Hox Genes & Body Plan Evolution ===
Spadella cephaloptera has been used as a model organism for studying Hox gene organization in chaetognaths. Papillon et al. (2003) conducted a survey of Hox genes in Spadella and found an unusual arrangement and expression pattern that diverges significantly from other known bilaterians. This suggests that chaetognaths may have retained ancestral features or evolved independently under unique selective pressures.

=== Significance of Benthic Lineages ===
Within Chaetognatha, Spadella and other benthic genera offer insight into the ecological transitions between pelagic and benthic lifestyles. These transitions may have influenced developmental simplification and nervous system reduction in benthic species like Spadella compared to their pelagic relatives. The genus is thus of interest not only for evolutionary genetics, but also for understanding functional morphology in varying ecological contexts.

== Recognized Species ==
According to the World Register of Marine Species (WoRMS), several species are currently recognized within the genus Spadella. The following list includes six representative species:

- Spadella angulata Tokioka, 1951
- Spadella birostrata Casanova, 1987
- Spadella bradshawi Bieri, 1974
- Spadella cephaloptera Busch, 1851
- Spadella ledoyeri Casanova, 1986
- Spadella valsalinae Winkelmann, Gasmi, Gretschel, Müller & Perez, 2012

Note: This is not a full list of the recognized species; the identity of species may be subject to change based on ongoing taxonomic revisions.
