= Paraspadella =

Scientific classification
- Kingdom: Animalia
- Phylum: Chaetognatha
- Class: Sagittoidea
- Order: Phragmophora
- Family: Spadellidae
- Genus: Paraspadella von Salvini-Plawen, 1986

Genus of marine worms

Paraspadella is a genus of chaetognaths in the family Spadellidae. Paraspadella was originally considered as Spadella before a revision separated that genus into three genera: Spadella, Paraspadella, and Gephyrospadella, the last of which is now synonymised to Paraspadella. The initial division was based on previous knowledge of three groups of Spadella, in a similar manner in which Sagitta was divided into a family of genera. Paraspadella is differentiated from Spadella by the presence of disparate (digital) adhesive organs, present in the former to various degrees, but entirely absent in the latter.

== Species ==
- Paraspadella anops Bowman & Bieri, 1989
- Paraspadella caecafea (von Salvini-Plawen, 1986)
- Paraspadella gotoi Casanova, 1990
- Paraspadella johnstoni (Mawson, 1944)
- Paraspadella legazpichessi (Alvariño, 1981)
- Paraspadella nana (Owre, 1963)
- Paraspadella pimukatharos (Alvariño, 1987)
- Paraspadella pulchella (Owre, 1963)
- Paraspadella schizoptera (Conant, 1895)
- Paraspadella sheardi (Mawson, 1944)
