= Eukrohnia fowleri =

Scientific classification
- Domain: Eukaryota
- Kingdom: Animalia
- Phylum: Chaetognatha
- Class: Sagittoidea
- Order: Phragmophora
- Family: Eukrohniidae
- Genus: Eukrohnia
- Species: E. fowleri

Binomial name
- Eukrohnia fowleri von Ritter-Záhony, 1909

Species of worm

Eukrohnia fowleri is a deep-sea marine arrow worm. It is the only known bioluminescent member of the genus Eukrohnia, and one of the two known species of bioluminescent arrow worms, the other being the distantly related Caecosagitta macrocephala. The bioluminescent organ of Eukrohnia fowleri is found along the center of its tail fin on both its dorsal and ventral side. It has a secreted bioluminescence that is thought to be coelenterazine based. While both species use luciferases in conjunction with coelenterazine for light emission, the luciferase of Eukrohnia fowleri is highly stable after 30 minutes while the luciferase of Caecosagitta macrocephala becomes inactive. So far, there is no other bioluminescent organism that uses hexagonal packing in order to hold bioluminescent materials/ E. fowleri evolved through the adaptation to hypoxic water and due to the recent oxygenation of water they have been experiencing bottleneck events. These events have been seen as one of the reasons that E. fowleri have such low biodiversity.
