= Martinus Slabber =

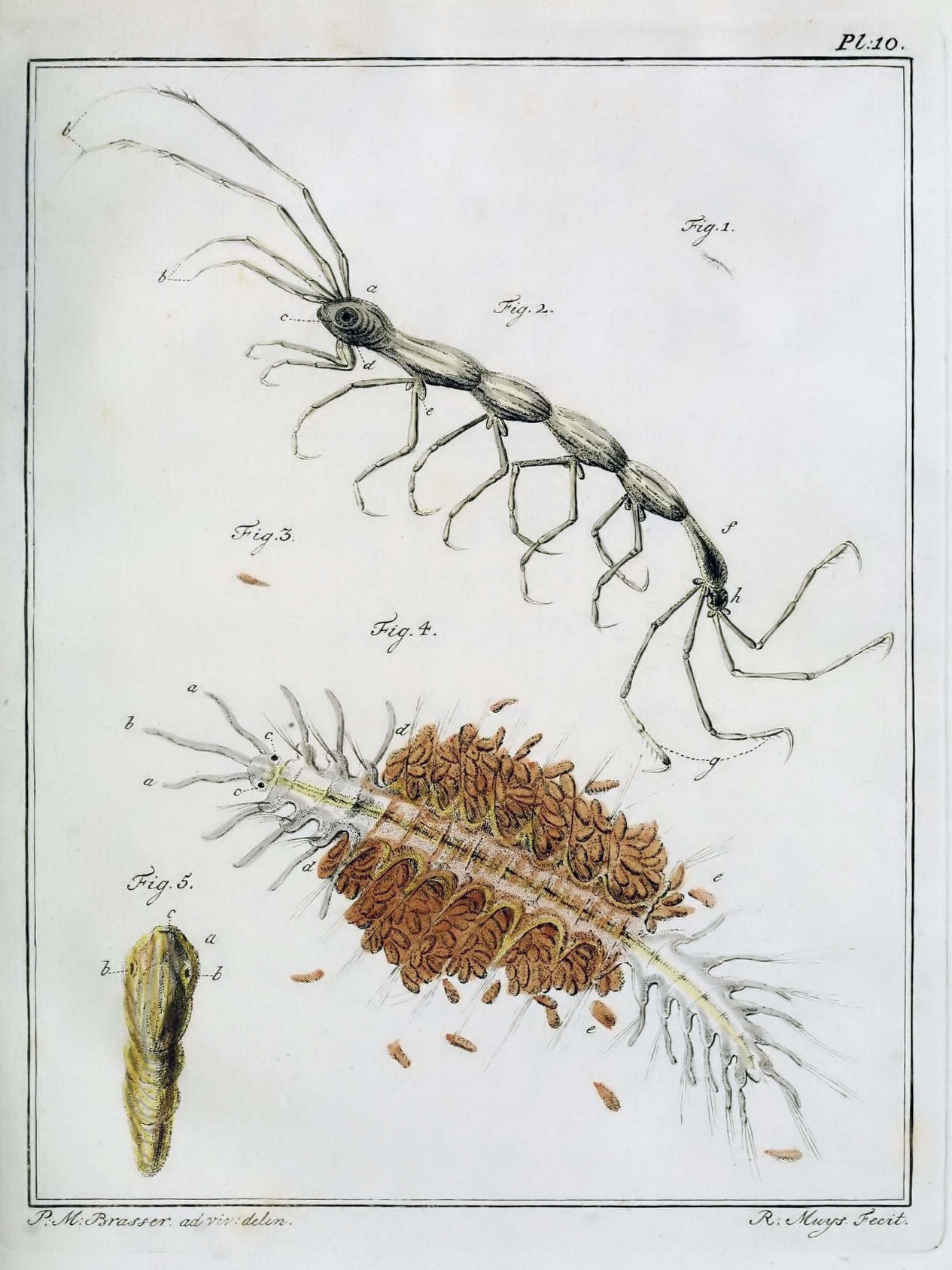
Top: Phtisica marina, 1769. Martinus Slabber: Natuurkundige verlustigingen, 1769, table 10

Martinus Slabber, also known as Martin Slabber (* Middelburg, October 31, 1740 ; † ’s-Gravenpolder, April 30, 1835), was a Dutch civil servant, naturalist and zoologist.

== Biography and work ==
Martinus Slabber was an official in the Dutch province of Zeeland, who was responsible for the towns of Baarland, Bakendorp und Oudelande and lived in Middelburg until 1768 and then in Goes , where he also served as mayor around 1820. Later, while based in 's-Gravenpolder, he was responsible for collecting taxes for part of Zuid-Beveland.

As naturalist and zoologist, he is the first who described chaetognaths. He also first described the amphipod crustacean Oniscus arenarius (1769), today known as Haustorius arenarius, and Phtisica marina, commonly known as the 'ghost shrimp'. He also described the dubious ctenophore Callianira hexagona.

Martinus Slabber had a taxidermy collection, mostly consisting of birds, which he sold to the Rijksmuseum van Natuurlijke Historie in Leiden in 1824. He also was known to have a small but renowned painting collection.

On 10 January 1771, under the presidency of the physician Ferdinand Jakob Baier, he was admitted to the Imperial Leopoldino-Carolinian Academy of Natural Scientists under the academic nickname Aelianus and registration number 751, at the suggestion of the malacologist Friedrich Christian Meuschen, who was serving as legation counselor in The Hague . In 1767, he became a member of the Hollandsche Maatschappij der Wetenschappen ( Holland Science Association), at the suggestion of Job Baster .

On 10 January 1771, under the presidency of the physician Ferdinand Jakob Baier, he was admitted to the German National Academy of Sciences (at the time the Imperial Leopoldino-Carolinian Academy of Natural Scientists) under the academic nickname Aelianus and registration number 751, at the suggestion of the malacologist Friedrich Christian Meuschen.

In 1767, he became a member of the Hollandsche Maatschappij der Wetenschappen, at the suggestion of Job Baster.

== Honours ==
The Belgian parasitologist and palaeontologist Pierre-Joseph van Beneden named the crustacean Mesopodopsis slabberi (1861) in honour of Slabber.

== Works ==
- Physikalische Belustigungen oder mikroskopische Wahrnehmungen von drey und vierzig in-und ausländischen Wasser- und Landthierchen durch Martinus Slabber. Aus dem holländischen übersetzt von P. L. St. Müller, Winterschmidt, Nürnberg 1775 (Digitalisat)
- Natuurkundige verlustigingen, behelzende microscopise waarneemingen van in- en uitlandse water- en land-dieren. Bosch, Te Haarlem 1778 (Digitalisat)
- Physikalische Belustigungen oder mikroskopische Wahrnehmungen von drey und vierzig in-und ausländischen Wasser- und Landthierchen. Winterschmidt, Nürnberg 1781 (Digitalisat)
- Verhandeling over het opzetten van vogelen. Sepp, Amsterdam 1816 (Digitalisat)

== Literature ==
- Hendrik Engel: Hendrik Engel's Alphabetical List of Dutch Zoological Cabinets and Menageries. Nieuwe Nederlandse Bijdragen tot de Geschiedenis der Geneeskunde en der Natuurwetenschappen, 19, 1986, p. 256 (PDF)
- Johann Daniel Ferdinand Neigebaur: Geschichte der kaiserlichen Leopoldino-Carolinischen deutschen Akademie der Naturforscher während des zweiten Jahrhunderts ihres Bestehens. Friedrich Frommann, Jena 1860, p. 230 (archive.org)
