= Bathybelos =

Scientific classification
- Kingdom: Animalia
- Phylum: Chaetognatha
- Class: Sagittoidea
- Order: Aphragmophora
- Family: Bathybelidae; Bieri, 1989
- Genus: Bathybelos; Owre, 1973
- Species: B. typhlops

Binomial name
- Bathybelos typhlops Owre, 1973

Family of marine worms

Bathybelidae is a family of sagittoideans in the order Aphragmophora. It consists of a single genus, Bathybelos Owre, 1973, which consists of a single species, Bathybelos typhlops Owre, 1973. It is unusual for having a dorsal ganglion instead of the ventral ganglion of all other chaetognaths, alongside a neck-like structure. These are believed to be adaptations to the deep-ocean benthic habitat of the animal.
