= Eukrohniidae =

Scientific classification
- Kingdom: Animalia
- Phylum: Chaetognatha
- Class: Sagittoidea
- Order: Phragmophora
- Family: Eukrohniidae; Tokioka, 1965
- Genus: Eukrohnia von Ritter-Záhony, 1909

Family of marine worms

Eukrohniidae is a family of sagittoideans in the order Phragmophora. It consists of a single genus, Eukrohnia von Ritter-Záhony, 1909.

== History ==
The first species of Eukrohniidae, Eukrohnia hamata, was identified by Karl Möbius in 1875. The genus was named Eukrohnia by R. von Ritter-Záhony in 1909 after August David Krohn. The family was named Eukrohniidae by Takasi Tokioka in 1965. One of the species, Eukrohnia fowleri, is bioluminescent.

== Species ==
- Eukrohnia bathyantarctica David, 1958
- Eukrohnia bathypelagica Alvariño, 1962
- Eukrohnia calliops McLelland, 1989
- Eukrohnia flaccicoeca Casanova, 1986
- Eukrohnia fowleri von Ritter-Záhony, 1909
- Eukrohnia hamata (Möbius, 1875)
- Eukrohnia kitoui Kuroda, 1981
- Eukrohnia macroneura Casanova, 1986
- Eukrohnia minuta Silas & Srinivasan, 1969
- Eukrohnia proboscidea Furnestin & Ducret, 1965
- Eukrohnia sinica Zhang & Chen, 1983
