= Spadellidae =

Scientific classification
- Kingdom: Animalia
- Phylum: Chaetognatha
- Class: Sagittoidea
- Order: Phragmophora
- Family: Spadellidae; Tokioka, 1965

Family of marine worms

Spadellidae is a family of sagittoideans in the order Phragmophora. Spadellidae prey on plankton and commonly reside in the epipelagic zone of the ocean.

== Genera ==
- Bathyspadella Tokioka, 1939
- Calispadella Casanova & Moreau, 2005
- Hemispadella Casanova, 1996
- Paraspadella von Salvini-Plawen, 1986
- Spadella Langerhans, 1880
