= Krohnitta =

Scientific classification
- Kingdom: Animalia
- Phylum: Chaetognatha
- Class: Sagittoidea
- Order: Aphragmophora
- Family: Krohnittidae; Tokioka, 1965
- Genus: Krohnitta; Ritter-Záhony, 1910

Family of marine worms

Krohnittidae is a family of chaetognaths in the order Aphragmophora. It consists of a single genus, Krohnitta von Ritter-Záhony, 1910.

== Species ==
- Krohnitta balagopali Nair, Panampunnayil, Pillai & Gireesh, 2008
- Krohnitta pacifica (Aida, 1897)
- Krohnitta subtilis (Grassi, 1881)
