= Eognathacantha =

Eognathacantha Temporal range: Cambrian Stage 3

Scientific classification
- Kingdom: Animalia
- Clade: Spiralia
- Clade: Gnathifera
- Clade: Cucullophora
- Phylum: Chaetognatha
- Genus: †Eognathacantha; Chen & Huang, 2002
- Species: †E. ercainella

Binomial name
- †Eognathacantha ercainella Chen & Huang, 2002

Extinct genus of arrow worm

Eognathacantha is an extinct genus of chaetognath from the Maotianshan Shales in southern China. It lived around 520 Ma, during the Cambrian Stage 3. It is the oldest known chaetognath. The only known species is Eognathacantha ercainella.

== Discovery and naming ==
It is only known from the holotype specimen ECO2001a and its counterpart ECO1001b found in the Maotianshan Shales Lagerstätte near Ercain village, near Kunming in southern China. The specimen is complete. It was named by Chen & Huang. The genus name probably comes from the Greek ēōs, meaning "dawn", gnathos, meaning "jaw" and akantha, meaning "spine". The species name might be derived from Ercai village near the site of the discovery. However, the etymology is not explicitly explained by the authors.

== Description ==
The specimen measures 25 mm (1.0 in) in length. The head is 2.8 mm (0.11 in) wide. The head carries about 12 slightly curved grasping spines, 6 on each side, each about 900 µm long. In the anterior part of the head, there are numerous spines which might be teeth ranging from 200 µm to 250 µm long. Possible muscle marks are found on the head. The body is 2.5 mm (0.10 in) wide, an 8 mm (0.3 in) long tail is distinguishable from the rest of the body. The trunk and the tail carry a pair of fins. The body appears to show the pharynx, the intestine and possibly the anus.

A biomechanical study comparing Eognathacantha with modern chaetognaths has confirmed that Eognathacantha was pelagic.
