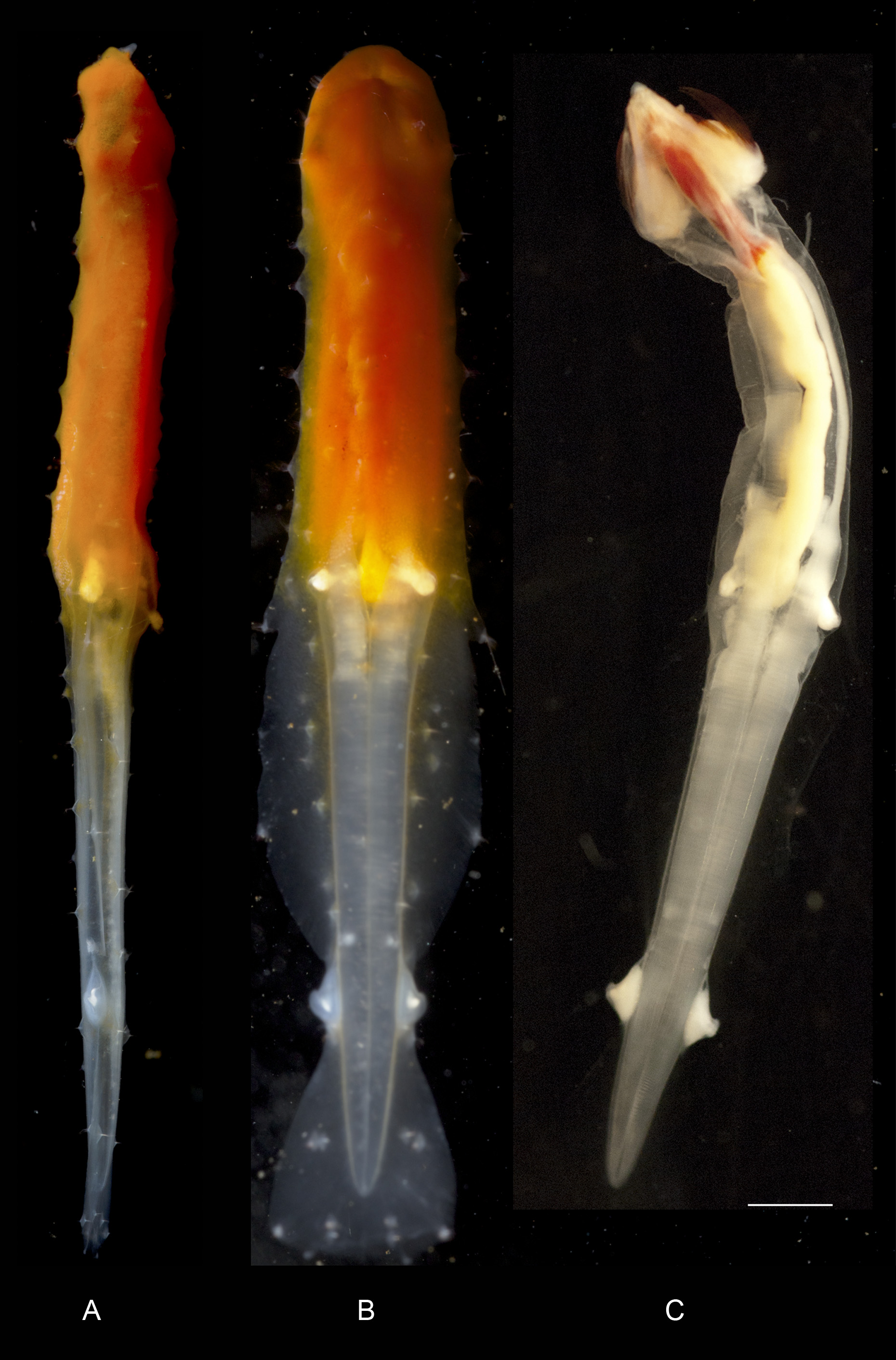
- Archeterokrohnia docrickettsae holotype. A, lateral view; B, dorsal view; C, dorsal view, after 4 months preservation. Scale bar: 2 mm.

Scientific classification
- Kingdom: Animalia
- Phylum: Chaetognatha
- Class: Sagittoidea
- Order: Phragmophora
- Family: Heterokrohniidae; Casanova, 1985

= Heterokrohniidae =

Family of marine worms

Heterokrohniidae is a family of sagittoideans in the order Phragmophora.

== Genera ==
- Archeterokrohnia Casanova, 1986
- Heterokrohnia von Ritter-Záhony, 1911
- Xenokrohnia Casanova, 1993
