= Archiv für Naturgeschichte =

- Discipline: natural history; exclusively on zoology, 1912–1926
- Language: German

Publication details
- History: 1835–1926
- Publisher: Nicolai Verlag (Germany)
- Frequency: annual

Standard abbreviations
- ISO 4: Arch. Naturgesch.

Indexing
- ISSN: 0365-6136
- LCCN: 09021005

Links
- Online archive

Archiv für Naturgeschichte was a German-language journal for natural history. It was founded by A. F. A. Wiegmann in 1835. The journal was published in Berlin from 1835 to 1926. There were 92 published volumes. From 1912 to 1926 each volume was published in two sections, namely, Abteilung A: Original-Arbeiten & Abteilung B: Jahres-Berichte. Abteilung A (i.e. Section A) published original articles on zoology. Abteilung B (i.e. Section B) published yearly reports on zoological articles published in the preceding year.
