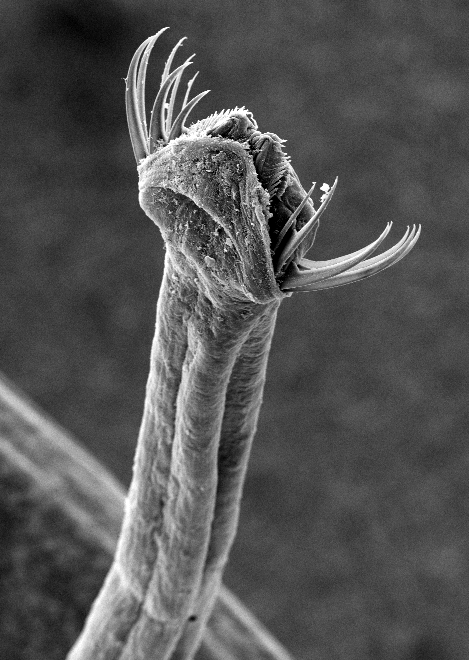
- Sagitta spp.

Scientific classification
- Domain: Eukaryota
- Kingdom: Animalia
- Phylum: Chaetognatha
- Class: Sagittoidea
- Order: Aphragmophora
- Family: Sagittidae; Claus & Grobben, 1905

= Sagittidae =

Family of marine worms

Sagittidae is a family of sagittoideans in the order Aphragmophora.

== Genera ==
- Aidanosagitta Tokioka & Pathansali, 1963
- Caecosagitta Tokioka, 1965
- Decipisagitta Bieri, 1991
- Ferosagitta Kassatkina, 1971
- Flaccisagitta Tokioka, 1965
- Mesosagitta Tokioka, 1965
- Parasagitta Tokioka, 1965
- Pseudosagitta Germain & Joubin, 1912
- Sagitta Quoy & Gaimard, 1827
- Serratosagitta Tokioka & Pathansali, 1963
- Solidosagitta Tokioka, 1965
- Zonosagitta Tokioka, 1965
