= Takasi Tokioka =

Japanese zoologist

Takasi Tokioka (時岡 隆, Tokioka Takashi; 1913 – September 30, 2001) was a Japanese zoologist. He published over 200 scientific articles on marine animals such as chaetognaths, ctenophores, and tunicates. He was Professor of Zoology at Kyoto University working at the Seto Marine Biological Laboratory in Shirahama, Japan. From 1975 to 1977, he was the Director of SMBL.

== Eponymous species ==
At least a dozen species are named in his honor, including these below.

- Acartia tokiokai Mori, 1942 - Copepoda
- Atlanta tokiokai van der Spoel & Troost, 1972 - Heteropoda
- Bolivina tokiokai Uchio, 1962 - Foraminifera
- Eudistoma tokiokai Nishikawa, 1990 - Ascidiacea
- Euchromadora tokiokai Wieser, 1955 - Nematoda
- Krohnittella tokiokai Bieri, 1974 - Chaetognatha
- Ophiocentrus tokiokai Irimura, 1981 - Ophiuroidea
- Polycarpa tokiokai Monniot & Monniot, 1996 - Ascidiacea
- Styela tokiokai Nishikawa, 1991 - Ascidiacea
