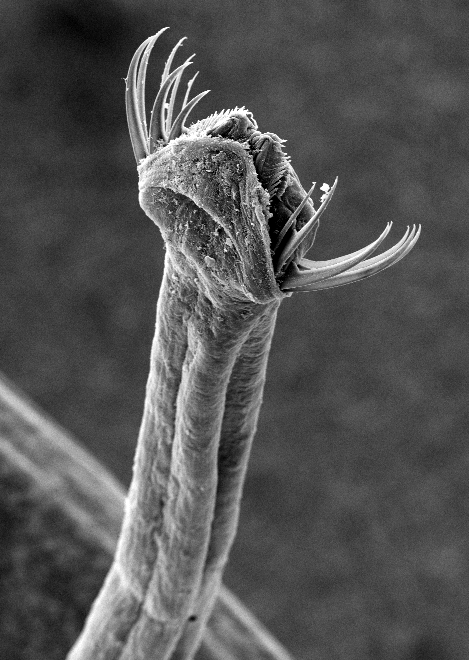
- The jaw organ of a Chaetognath of the genus Sagitta

Scientific classification
- Domain: Eukaryota
- Kingdom: Animalia
- Phylum: Chaetognatha
- Class: Sagittoidea
- Order: Aphragmophora; Tokioka, 1965

= Aphragmophora =

Order of marine worms

Aphragmophora is an order of sagittodieans in the phylum Chaetognatha.

== Families ==
- Bathybelidae Bieri, 1989
- Krohnittidae Tokioka, 1965
- Pterokrohniidae Bieri, 1991
- Pterosagittidae Tokioka, 1965
- Sagittidae Claus & Grobben, 1905

== See also ==
- Taxonomy of invertebrates (Brusca & Brusca, 2003)
