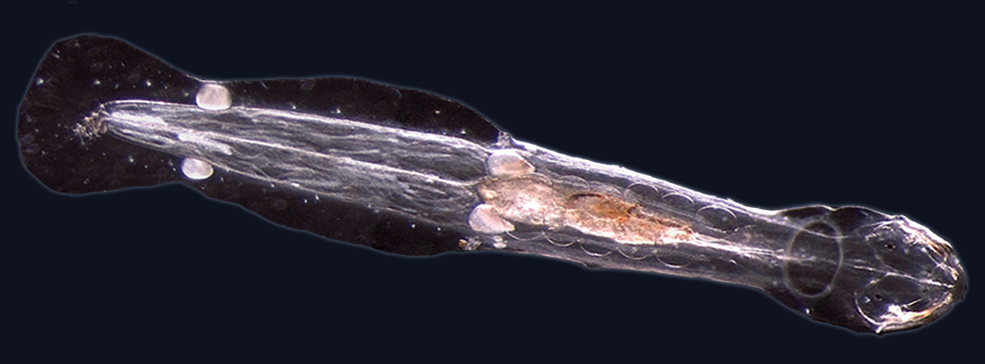
- Spadella cephaloptera

Scientific classification
- Domain: Eukaryota
- Kingdom: Animalia
- Phylum: Chaetognatha
- Class: Sagittoidea
- Order: Phragmophora; Tokioka, 1965

= Phragmophora =

Order of marine worms

Phragmophora is an order of sagittoideans in the phylum Chaetognatha.

== Families ==
- Eukrohniidae Tokioka, 1965
- Heterokrohniidae Casanova, 1985
- Krohnittellidae Bieri, 1989
- Spadellidae Tokioka, 1965

== See also ==
- Taxonomy of invertebrates (Brusca & Brusca, 2003)
- Taxonomy of the animals (Hutchins et al., 2003)
