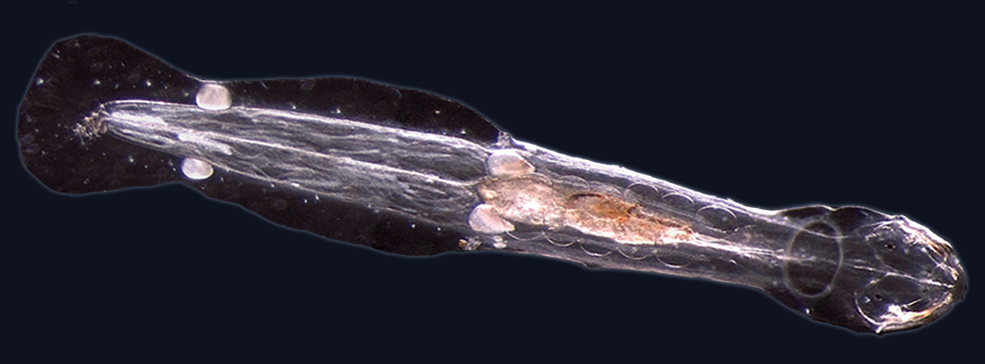
- Spadella cephaloptera (Phragmophora)
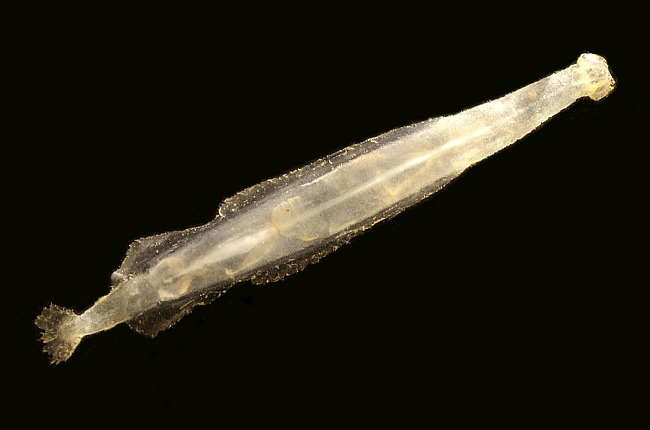
- Pseudosagitta maxima (Aphragmophora)

Scientific classification
- Kingdom: Animalia
- Subkingdom: Eumetazoa
- Clade: ParaHoxozoa
- Clade: Bilateria
- Clade: Nephrozoa
- Clade: Protostomia
- Clade: Spiralia
- Clade: Gnathifera
- Clade: Cucullophora
- Phylum: Chaetognatha; Leuckart, 1854
- Class: Sagittoidea; Claus & Grobben, 1905

Orders
- Total group Chaetognatha; †Nectocarididae; †Timorebestia; Cucullophora; †Amiskwia; Chaetognatha; †Ankalodous?; †Capinatator; Crown group Chaetognatha; Aphragmophora; Phragmophora; †Protoconodonta; †Eognathacantha; †Eoserratosagitta; †Paucijaculum; †Protosagitta; †Titerina?

= Chaetognatha =

Arrow worms Temporal range: Lower Cambrian–Recent

Phylum of marine worms

The Chaetognatha /kiːˈtɒɡnəθə/ or chaetognaths /ˈkiːtɒɡnæθs/ (meaning bristle-jaws) are a phylum of predatory marine worms that are a major component of plankton worldwide. Commonly known as arrow worms, they are mostly pelagic; however about 20% of the known species are benthic, and can attach to algae and rocks. They are found in all marine waters, from surface tropical waters and shallow tide pools to the deep sea and polar regions. Most chaetognaths are transparent and are torpedo shaped, but some deep-sea species are orange. They range in size from 2 to 120 millimetres (0.1 to 4.7 in).

Chaetognaths were first recorded by the Dutch naturalist Martinus Slabber in 1775. As of 2021, biologists recognize 133 modern species assigned to over 26 genera and eight families. Despite the limited diversity of species, the number of individuals is large.

Arrow worms are strictly related to and possibly belonging to Gnathifera, a clade of protostomes that do not belong to either Ecdysozoa or Lophotrochozoa.

== Anatomy ==
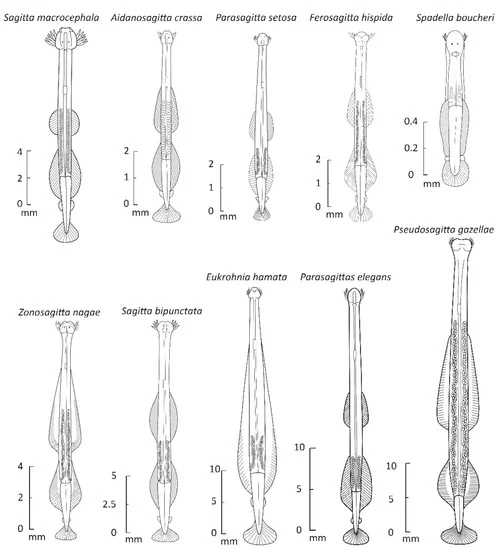
Drawing of ten different chaetognath species, showing morphological similarity and diversity.

Chaetognaths are transparent or translucent dart-shaped animals covered by a cuticle. They range in length between 1.5 mm to 105 mm in the Antarctic species Pseudosagitta gazellae. Body size, either between individuals in the same species or between different species, seems to increase with decreasing temperature. The body is divided into a distinct head, trunk, and tail. The longitudinal musculature, which makes up approximately 80% of the body's volume, contracts against a hydrostatic skeleton consisting of a fluid-filled body cavity enclosed by the cuticle and a dense sheath of helically arranged collagen fibrils. Also a transverse musculature is present in most representants of order Phragmophora (vestigial in Eukrohniidae), but is absent in Aphragmophora.

=== Head and digestive system ===
There are between four and fourteen hooked, grasping spines on each side of their head, flanking a hollow vestibule containing the mouth. The spines are used in hunting, and covered with a flexible hood arising from the neck region when the animal is swimming. Spines and teeth are made of α-chitin, and the head is protected by a chitinous armature.

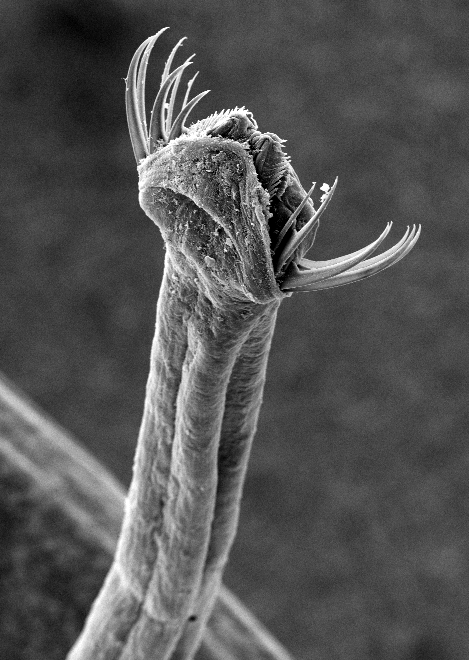
The jaw organ of a chaetognath of the genus Sagitta

The mouth opens into a muscular pharynx, which contains glands to lubricate the passage of food. From here, a straight intestine runs the length of the trunk to an anus just forward of the tail. The intestine is the primary site of digestion and includes a pair of diverticula near the anterior end. Materials are moved about the body cavity by cilia. Waste materials are simply excreted through the skin and anus. Eukrohniid species possess an oil vacuole closely associated with the gut. This organ contains wax esters which may assist reproduction and growth outside of the production season for Eukrohnia hamata in Arctic seas. Owing to the position of the oil vacuole in the center of the tractus, the organ may also have implications for buoyancy, trim and locomotion.

Usually chaetognaths are not pigmented, however the intestines of some deep-sea species contain orange-red carotenoid pigments.

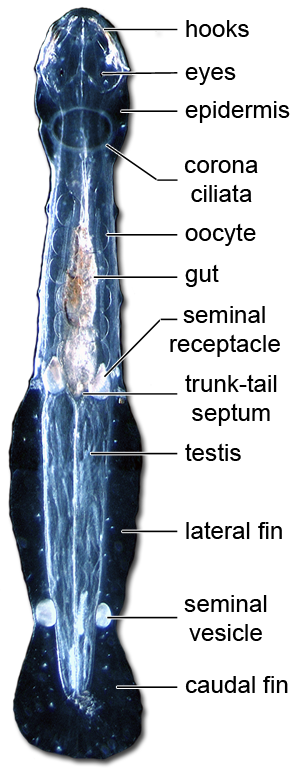
Anatomy of a chaetognath (Spadella cephaloptera)

=== Nervous and sensory systems ===
The nervous system is reasonably simple and shows a typical protostome anatomy, consisting of a ganglionated nerve ring surrounding the pharynx. The brain is composed of two distinct functional domains: the anterior neuropil domain and the posterior neuropil domain. The former probably controls head muscles moving the spines and the digestive system. The latter is linked to eyes and the corona ciliata. A putative sensory structure of unknown function, the retrocerebral organ, is also hosted by the posterior neuropil domain. The ventral ganglion is the largest, but nerves extend from all the ganglia along the length of the body.

Chaetognaths have two compound eyes, each consisting of a number of pigment-cup ocelli fused together; some deep-sea and troglobitic species have unpigmented or absent eyes. In addition, there are a number of sensory bristles arranged in rows along the side of the body, where they probably perform a function similar to that of the lateral line in fish. An additional, curved, band of sensory bristles lies over the head and neck. Almost all chaetognaths have "indirect" or "inverted" eyes, according to the orientation of photoreceptor cells; only some Eukhroniidae species have "direct" or "everted" eyes. A unique feature of the chaetognath eye is the lamellar structure of photoreceptor membranes, containing a grid of 35–55 nm wide circular pores.

A significant mechanosensory system, composed of ciliary receptor organs, detects vibrations, allowing chaetognaths to detect the swimming motion of potential prey. Another organ on the dorsal part of the neck, the corona ciliata, is probably involved in chemoreception.

=== Internal organs ===
The body cavity is lined by peritoneum, and therefore represents a true coelom, and is divided into one compartment on each side of the trunk, and additional compartments inside the head and tail, all separated completely by septa. Although they have a mouth with one or two rows of tiny teeth, compound eyes, and a nervous system, they have no excretory or respiratory systems. While often said to lack a circulatory system, chaetognaths do have a rudimentary hemal system resembling those of annelids.

The arrow worm rhabdomeres are derived from microtubules 20 nm long and 50 nm wide, which in turn form conical bodies that contain granules and thread structures. The cone body is derived from a cilium.

=== Locomotion ===
The trunk bears one or two pairs of lateral fins incorporating structures superficially similar to the fin rays of fish, with which they are not homologous. Unlike those of vertebrates, these lateral fins are composed of a thickened basement membrane extending from the epidermis. An additional caudal fin covers the post-anal tail. Two chaetognath species, Caecosagitta macrocephala and Eukrohnia fowleri, have bioluminescent organs on their fins.

Chaetognaths swim in short bursts using a dorso-ventral undulating body motion, where their tail fin assists with propulsion and the body fins with stabilization and steering. To avoid sinking they need to swim regularly, but many species have ammonium-filled vacuolated cells in the trunk, which gives them close to neutral buoyancy. Muscle movements have been described as among the fastest of any animals. Muscles are directly excitable by electrical currents or strong K+ solutions; the main neuromuscular transmitter is acetylcholine.

== Reproduction and life cycle ==
All species are hermaphroditic, carrying both eggs and sperm. Each animal possesses a pair of testes within the tail, and a pair of ovaries in the posterior region of the main body cavity. Immature sperm are released from the testes to mature inside the cavity of the tail, and then swim through a short duct to a seminal vesicle where they are packaged into a spermatophore.

During mating, each individual places a spermatophore onto the neck of its partner after rupture of the seminal vesicle. The sperm rapidly escape from the spermatophore and swim along the midline of the animal until they reach a pair of small pores just in front of the tail. These pores connect to the oviducts, into which the developed eggs have already passed from the ovaries, and it is here that fertilisation takes place. The seminal receptacles and oviducts accumulate and store spermatozoa, to perform multiple fertilisation cycles. Some benthic members of Spadellidae are known to have elaborate courtship rituals before copulation, for example Paraspadella gotoi.

The eggs are mostly planktonic, except in a few species such as Ferosagitta hispida that attaches eggs to the substrate. In Eukrohnia, eggs develop in marsupial sacs or attached to algae. Eggs usually hatch after 1–3 days. Chaetognaths do not undergo metamorphosis nor they possess a well-defined larval stage, an unusual trait among marine invertebrates; however there are significant morphological differences between the newborn and the adult, with respect to proportions, chitinous structures and fin development.

The life spans of chaetognaths are variable but short; the longest recorded was 15 months in Sagitta friderici.

== Behaviour ==
Little is known of arrow worms' behaviour and physiology, due to the complexity in culturing them and reconstructing their natural habitat. It is known that they feed more frequently with higher temperatures. Planktonic chaetognaths often must swim continuously, with a "hop and sink" behaviour, to keep themselves in the desired location in the water layer, and swim actively to catch prey. They all tend to keep the body slightly slanted with the head pointing downwards. They often show a "gliding" behaviour, slowly sinking for a while, and then catching up with a quick movement of their fins. Benthic species usually stay attached to substrates such as rocks, algae or sea grasses, more rarely on top or between sand grains, and act more strictly as ambush predators, staying still until prey passes by. The prey is detected thanks to the ciliary fence and tuft organs, sensing vibrations – individuals of Spadella cephaloptera for example will attack a glass or metal probe vibrating at an adequate frequency. To catch prey, arrow worms jump forward with a strong stroke of the tail fin. Once in contact with prey, they withdraw the hood over the grasping spines, so that it forms a cage around the prey and bring it in contact with the mouth. They swallow their prey whole.

== Ecology ==
Chaetognaths are found in all world's oceans, from the poles to tropics, and also in brackish and estuarine waters. They inhabit very diverse environments, from hydrothermal vents to deep ocean seafloor, to seagrass beds and marine caves. The majority are planktonic, and they are often the second most common component of zooplankton, with a biomass ranging between 10 and 30% that of copepods. In the Canada Basin, chaetognaths alone represent ~13% of the zooplankton biomass. As such, they are ecologically relevant and a key food source for fishes and other predators, including commercially relevant fishes such as mackerel or sardines. 58% of known species are pelagic, while about a third of species are epibenthic or meiobenthic, or inhabit the immediate vicinity of the substrate. Chaetognaths have been recorded up to five and possibly even six kilometers deep.

The highest density of chaetognaths is observed in the photic zone of shallow waters. Larger chaetognath species tend to live deeper in water, but spend their juvenile stages higher in the water column. Arrow worms however engage in diel vertical migration, spending the day at lower depths to avoid predators, and coming close to the surface at night. Their position in the water column can depend on light, temperature, salinity, age and food supply. They cannot swim against oceanic currents, and they are used as a hydrological indicator of currents and water masses.

All chaetognaths are ambush predators, preying on other planktonic animals, mostly copepods and cladocerans but also amphipods, krill and fish larvae. Adults can feed on younger individuals of the same species. Some species are also reported to be omnivores, feeding on algae and detritus. Chaetognaths are known to use the neurotoxin tetrodotoxin to subdue prey, possibly synthesized by Vibrio bacterial species.

== Genetics ==
In 2025, the genome of the arrow worm Paraspadella gotoi has been published. The genome is 257 Mb long, consists of 9 chromosomes and includes 22,072 protein-coding genes, with 20% of the sequence being occupied by repeats. The genome lacks genes for the centromeric histone H3 and CENPT, both proteins involved in the centromere; a condition associated with faster rearrangements of the genome in other species. Accordingly, genomic analysis indicates a higher rate of chromosomal rearrangement in gnathiferans. The P. gotoi genome also shows evidence of a significant gene duplication event, probably due to a burst of tandem gene duplication (a rare condition in animal genomes) instead than to a whole genome duplication event, involving 3,379 gene families. Many of these genes are involved in development and ion transmembrane transport. Chaetognaths seem to include as many as 2,250 unique gene families, a large number compared with the 157 unique gene families of Mollusca or 124 unique gene families of Echinodermata. Nearly half the chaetognath genes undergo trans-splicing.

=== Mitochondrial genome ===
The mtDNA of the arrow worm Spadella cephaloptera has been sequenced in 2004, and at the time it was the smallest metazoan mitochondrial genome known, being 11,905 base pairs long (it has now been surpassed by the mitchondrial genome of the ctenophore Mnemiopsis leidyi, which is 10,326 bp long). All mitochondrial tRNA genes are absent. The MT-ATP8 and MT-ATP6 genes are also missing. The mtDNA of Paraspadella gotoi, also sequenced in 2004, is even smaller (11,403 bp) and it shows a similar pattern, lacking 21 of the 22 usually present tRNA genes and featuring only 14 of the 37 genes normally present.

Chaetognaths show a unique mitochondrial genomic diversity within individual of the same species.

== Phylogeny and evolution ==
=== Evolution and relationship to other animals ===
The evolutionary relationships of chaetognaths have long been enigmatic. Charles Darwin remarked that arrow worms were "remarkable for the obscurity of their affinities". Chaetognaths in the past have been traditionally, but erroneously, classed as deuterostomes by embryologists due to deuterostome-like features in the embryo. Lynn Margulis and K. V. Schwartz placed chaetognaths in the deuterostomes in their Five Kingdom classification. However, several developmental features are at odds with deuterostomes and are either akin to Spiralia or unique to Chaetognatha.

Molecular phylogeny shows that Chaetognatha are, in fact, protostomes. Thomas Cavalier-Smith places them in the protostomes in his Six Kingdom classification. The similarities between chaetognaths and nematodes mentioned above may support the protostome thesis—in fact, chaetognaths are sometimes regarded as a basal ecdysozoan or lophotrochozoan. Chaetognatha appears close to the base of the protostome tree in most studies of their molecular phylogeny. This may explain their deuterostome embryonic characters. If chaetognaths branched off from the protostomes before they evolved their distinctive protostome embryonic characters, they might have retained deuterostome characters inherited from early bilaterian ancestors. Thus chaetognaths may be a useful model for the ancestral bilaterian. Studies of arrow worms' nervous systems suggests they should be placed within the protostomes. According to 2017 and 2019 papers, chaetognaths either belong to or are the sister group of Gnathifera.

In 2025, the sequencing of Paraspadella gotoi revealed that the chaetognath lineage underwent both extensive chromosomal fusions, gene loss and gene duplication, and feature an unusual number of phylum-specific gene families that seem to have an important role in shaping novel cell types. One of the duplication events involved the Hox cluster, probably playing a role in sculpting the unique chaetognath body plan. Overall, according to researchers, the chaetognath body plan seems to have gone thought a morphological simplification and then secondarily evolved higher complexity not by incorporating and adapting the ancestral bilaterian genetic toolkit, but by discarding most of it and then evolving its own new genes, thus explaining at least in part the enigmatic uniqueness of these animals.

A modern consensus phylogenetic tree for Spiralia is shown below, mainly based on the one by Struck (2026), which summarizes relationships found in phylogenomic studies from 2019 to 2025:

- Protostomia
  - Ecdysozoa
  - Spiralia / Lophotrochozoa (s.lss.)
    - Gnathifera (s.l.) / Chaetognathifera
      - Chaetognatha
      - Gnathostomulida
      - - Micrognathozoa
        - Rotifera
    - Platytrochozoa / Lophotrochozoa (s.l.)
      - - Cycliophora
        - Entoprocta
      - Rouphozoa
        - Gastrotricha
        - Platyhelminthes
      - ?Dicyemida
      - ?Orthonectida
      - Annelida
      - Nemertea
      - Mollusca
      - Lophophorata
        - Brachiopoda
        - - Bryozoa
          - Phoronida

=== Fossil record ===
Cladogram after Vinther et al. 2025:

- Chaetognathifera
  - Gnathifera s.s.
    - Gnathostomulida
    - - Micrognathozoa
      - Rotifera
  - - - †Timorebestia
      - †Nectocarididae
    - - †Amiskwia
      - Chaetognatha (arrow worms)

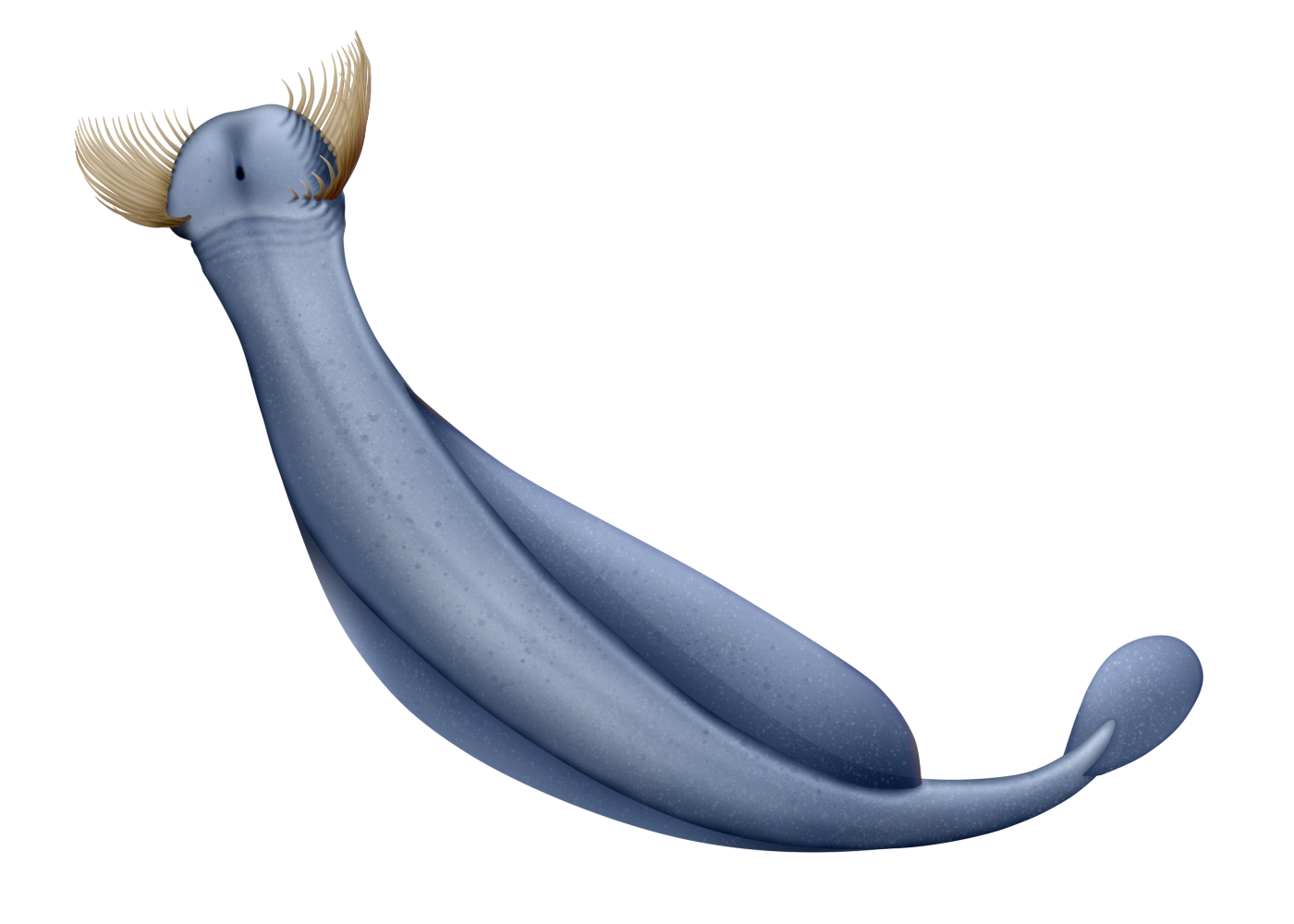
Life restoration of Capinatator from the Burgess Shale (c. 505 million years ago), one of the oldest true chaetognaths

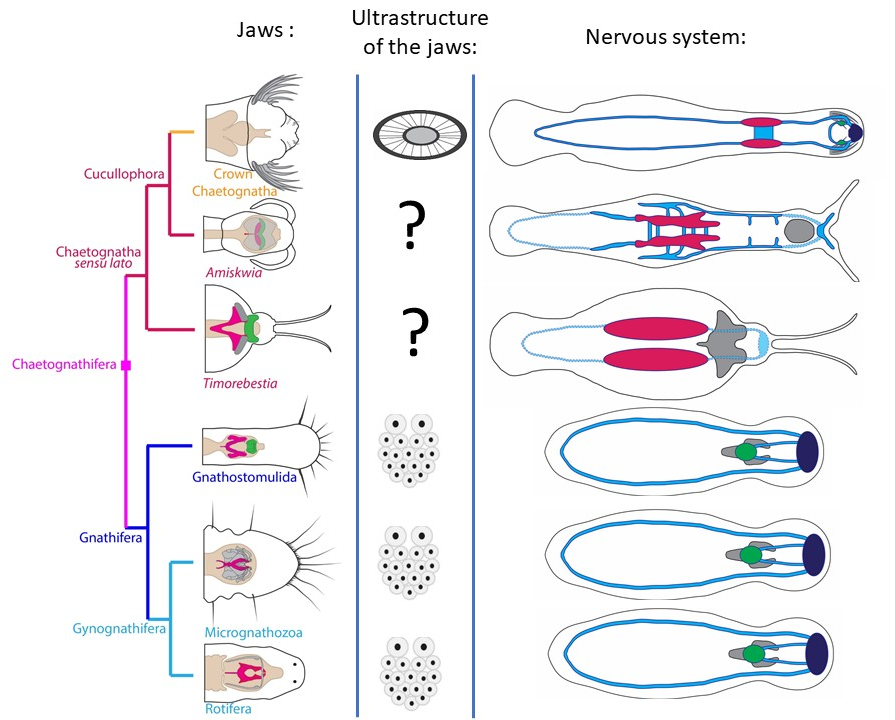
Hypothesis of the possible homology between the jaw parts and nervous system parts of extant and extinct Chaetognathifera taxa. Putative homologies between jaw parts and nervous system respectively have the same color. Questionable, and/or, disputable homologies are in grey. Non observed parts of the nervous system are in dotted lines. Only the anterior part of each organism is represented for the jaws. Modified from Bekkouche and Gąsiorowski 2022

Due to their soft bodies, chaetognaths fossilize poorly. Even so, several fossil chaetognath species have been described. Chaetognaths first appear during the Cambrian Period. Complete body fossils have been formally described from the Lower Cambrian Maotianshan shales of Yunnan, China (Eognathacantha ercainella Chen & Huang and Protosagitta spinosa Hu) and the Middle Cambrian Burgess Shale of British Columbia (Capinatator praetermissus.) A Cambrian stem-group chaetognath, Timorebestia, first described in 2024, was much larger than modern species, showing that chaetognaths occupied different roles in marine ecosystems compared to today. A more recent chaetognath, Paucijaculum samamithion Schram, has been described from the Mazon Creek biota from the Pennsylvanian of Illinois. The enigmatic squid-like Nectocaris, documented from the Burgess Shale since 1910 and described in 1976, was recognized as a stem-chateognath related to Timorebestia in 2025, despite its much different morphology from modern chaetognaths.

Chaetognaths were thought possibly to be related to some of the animals grouped with the conodonts. The conodonts themselves, however, have been shown to be dental elements of vertebrates. It is now thought that protoconodont elements (e.g., Protohertzina anabarica Missarzhevsky, 1973), are probably grasping spines of chaetognaths rather than teeth of conodonts. Previously chaetognaths in the Early Cambrian were only suspected from these protoconodont elements, but the more recent discoveries of body fossils have confirmed their presence then. There is evidence that chaetognaths were important components of the oceanic food web already in the Early Cambrian.

=== Internal phylogeny ===
Below is a consensus evolutionary tree of extant Chaetognatha, based on both morphological and molecular data, as of 2021.

- Chaetognatha
  - - Heterokrohniidae
    - Eukrohniidae
  - - Spadellidae
    - - Krohnittidae
      - Sagittidae

== History ==
The first known description of a chaetognath has been published by Dutch naturalist Martinus Slabber in the 1770s; he also coined the name "arrow worm". The zoologist Henri Marie Ducrotay de Blainville also briefly mentioned probable chaetognaths but he understood them as pelagic mollusks. The first description of a currently accepted species of chaetognath, Sagitta bipunctata, is from 1827. Among the early zoologists describing arrow worms, there is Charles Darwin, who took notes about them during the voyage of the Beagle and in 1844 dedicated a paper to them. In the following year, August David Krohn published an early anatomical description of Sagitta bipunctata.

The term "chaetognath" has been coined in 1856 by Rudolf Leuckart. He was also the first to propose that the genus Sagitta belonged to a separate group: «At the moment, it seems most natural to regard the Sagittas as representatives of a small group of their own that makes the transition from the real annelids (first of all the lumbricines) to the nematodes, and may not be unsuitably named Chaetognathi.»

The modern systematics of Chaetognatha begins in 1911 with Ritter-Záhony and is later consolidated by Takasi Tokioka in 1965 and Robert Bieri in 1991. Tokioka introduced the orders Phragmophora and Aphragmophora, and classified four families, six genera, for a total of 58 species – plus the extinct Amiskwia, classified as a true primitive chaetognath in a separate class, Archisagittoidea.

Chaetognaths were for a while considered as belonging or affine to the deuterostomes, but suspects of their affinities among Spiralia or other protostomes were already present as early as 1986. Their affinities with protostomes were clarified in 2004 by sequencing and analysis of mtDNA.

== Infection by giant viruses ==
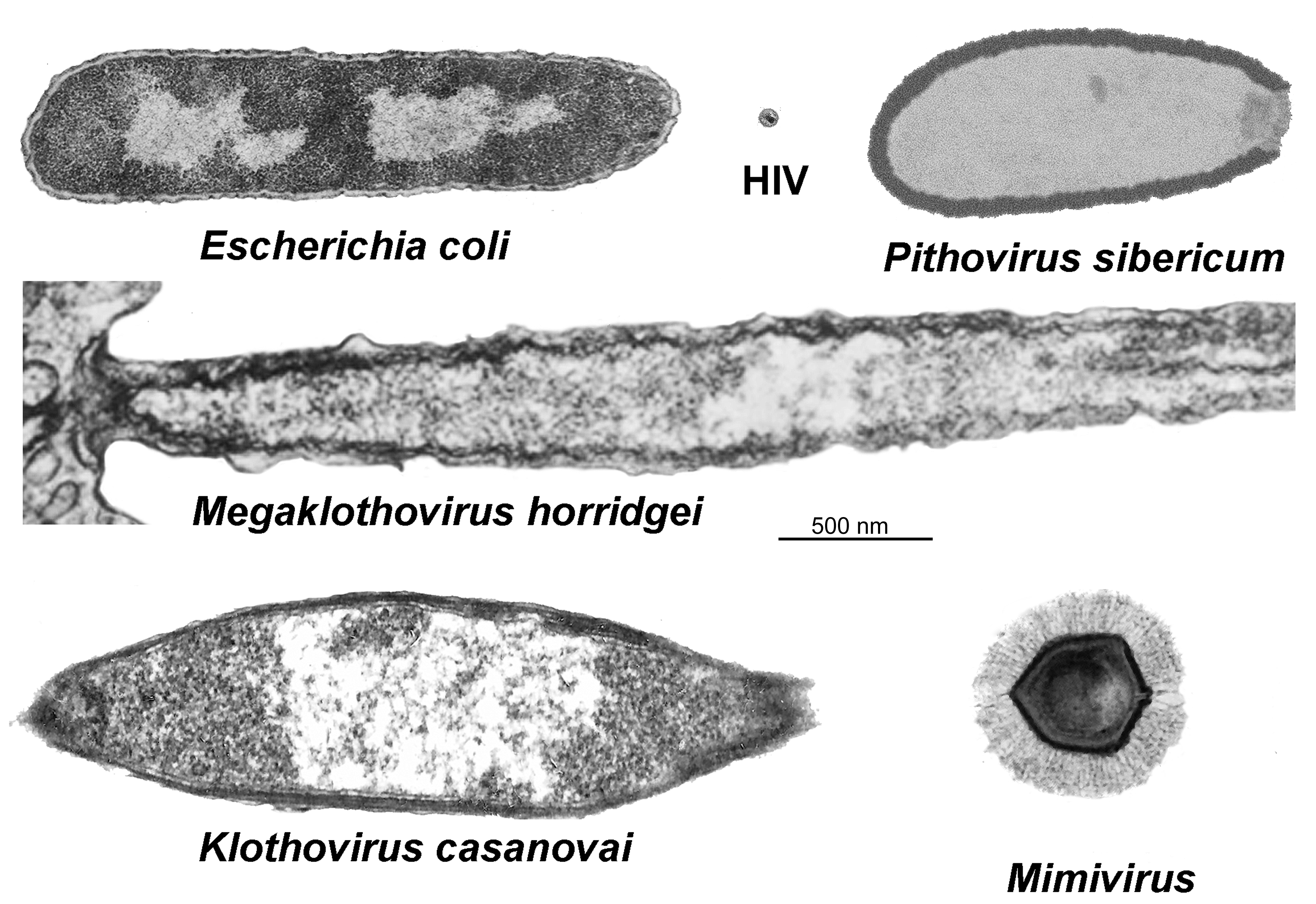
Comparison of size between various viruses and the bacteria E. coli

In 2018, reanalysis of electron microscopy photographs from the 1980s allowed scientists to identify a giant virus (Meelsvirus) infecting Adhesisagitta hispida; its site of multiplication is nuclear and the virions (length: 1.25 μm) are enveloped. In 2019, reanalysis of other previous studies has shown that structures that were taken in 1967 for bristles present on the surface of the species Spadella cephaloptera, and in 2003, for bacteria infecting Paraspadella gotoi, were in fact enveloped and spindle-shaped giant viruses with a cytoplasmic site of multiplication. The viral species infecting P. gotoi, whose maximum length is 3.1 μm, has been named Klothovirus casanovai (Klotho being the Greek name for one of the three Fates whose attribute was a spindle, and casanovai, in tribute to Pr J.-P. Casanova who devoted a large part of his scientific life to the study of chaetognaths). The other species has been named Megaklothovirus horridgei (in tribute to Adrian Horridge, the first author of the 1967 article). On a photograph, one of the viruses M. horridgei, although truncated, is 3.9 μm long, corresponding to about twice the length of the bacteria Escherichia coli. Many ribosomes are present in virions but their origin remains unknown (cellular, viral or only partly viral). To date, giant viruses known to infect animals are exceptionally rare.
