= List of bilaterian orders =

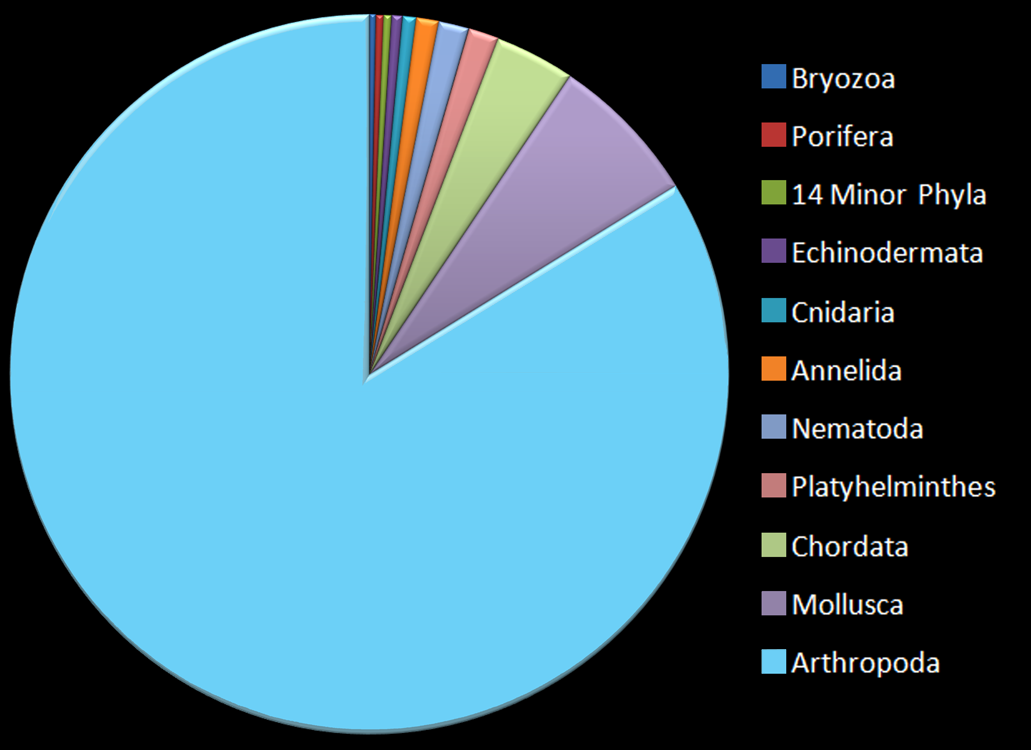
The relative number of species contributed to the total by each phylum of animals. Arthropoda is the phylum with the most described species.

Bilateria is an extremely diverse group of animals containing a vast majority of its species, largely due to the enormous amount of arthropods. This article is a list of orders contained within Bilateria separated by phylum. Groups that are not contained within an order are listed separately.

== List ==
=== Phylum Annelida ===
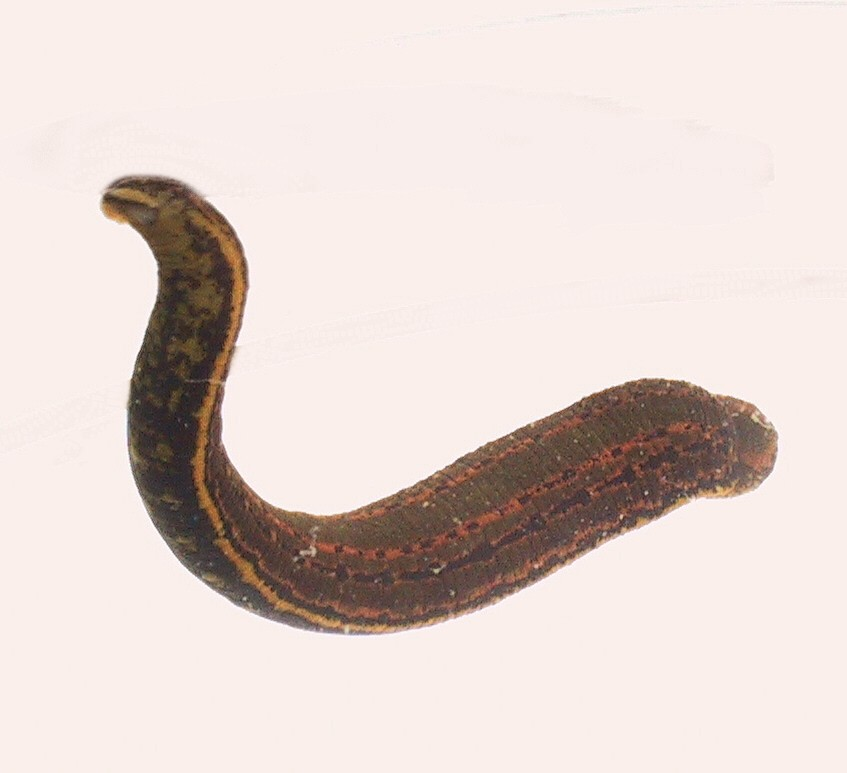
Hirudo medicinalis. Order Arhynchobdellida

Annelid taxonomy is currently under constant revisions due to the discovery that the class Polychaeta is paraphyletic. As such, a comprehensive list of orders is likely to change depending on what is accepted as valid.

- Amphinomida

Class Sipuncula

- Aspidosiphonida
- Golfingiida
- Phascolosomatida

Clade Pleistoannelida

- Clade Errantia
  - Eunicida
  - Phyllodocida
  - Protodrilida
- Myzostomida
- Clade Sedentaria
  - Capitellida (Note: This order traditionally also includes the families Maldanidae and Arenicolidae, but is now believed to only contain Echiura and family Capitellidae. Maldanidae and Arenicolidae have been moved to the clade Maldanomorpha)
    - Family Capitellidae
    - Subclass Echiura
      - Bonelliida
      - Echiurida
  - Opheliida
  - Orbiniida
  - Sabellida
  - Spionida
  - Terebellida
  - Class Clitellata
    - Branchiobdellida
    - Haplotaxida
    - Lumbriculida
    - Moniligastrida
    - Subclass Hirudinea
      - Rhynchobdellida
      - Arhynchobdellida

Unplaced groups

- Genus Apistobranchus
- Suborder Chaetopteriformia
- Suborder Cirratuliformia
- Genus Lobatocerebrum
- Clade Maldanomorpha
- Clade Paleoannelida
- Family Polygordiidae
- Family Siboglinidae (Note: This family is traditionally placed in the order Sabellida, but is now considered to be closest to Cirratuliformia and as such is now unplaced)

=== Phylum Arthropoda ===
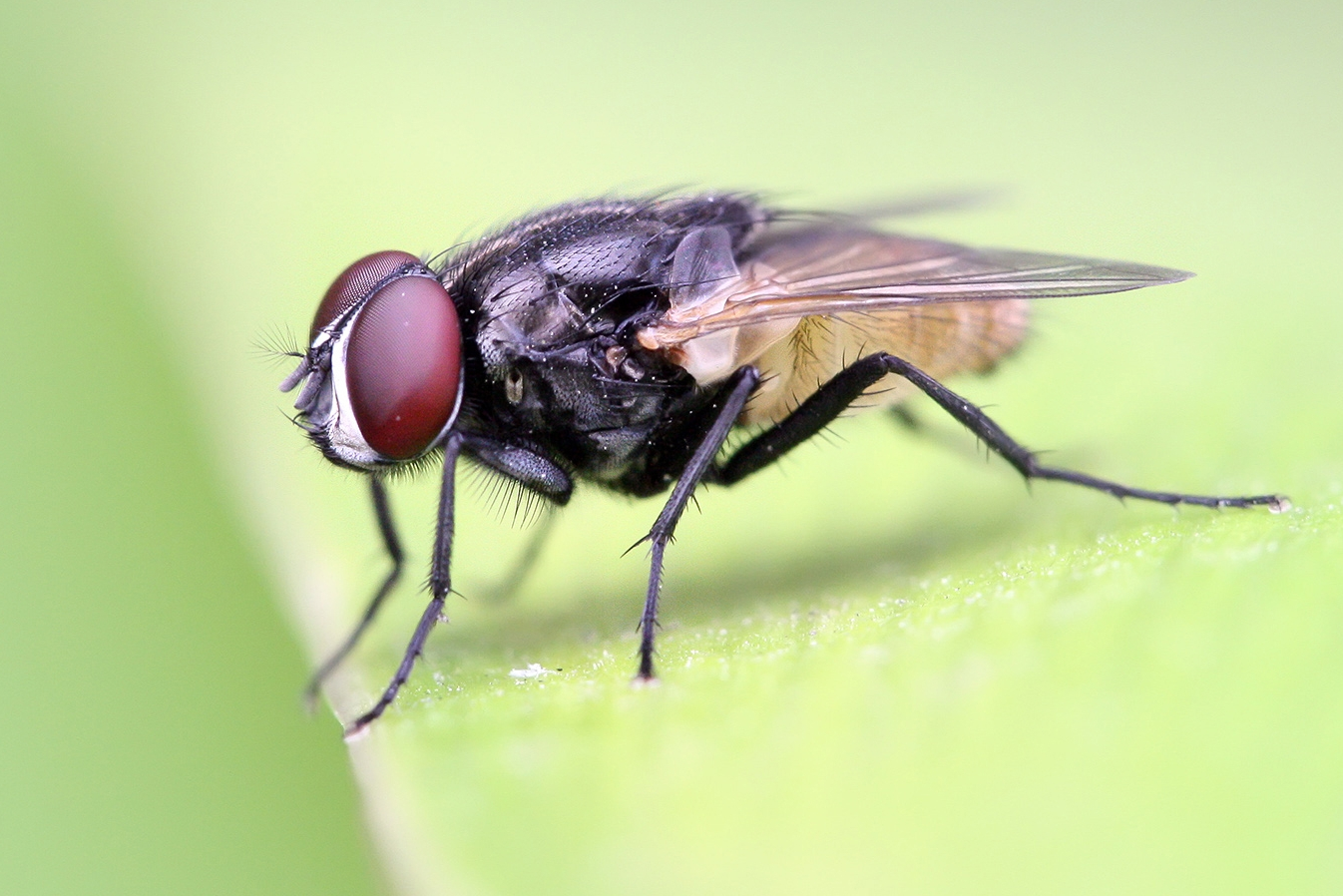
The house fly. Order Diptera

See List of arthropod orders

=== Phylum Brachiopoda ===
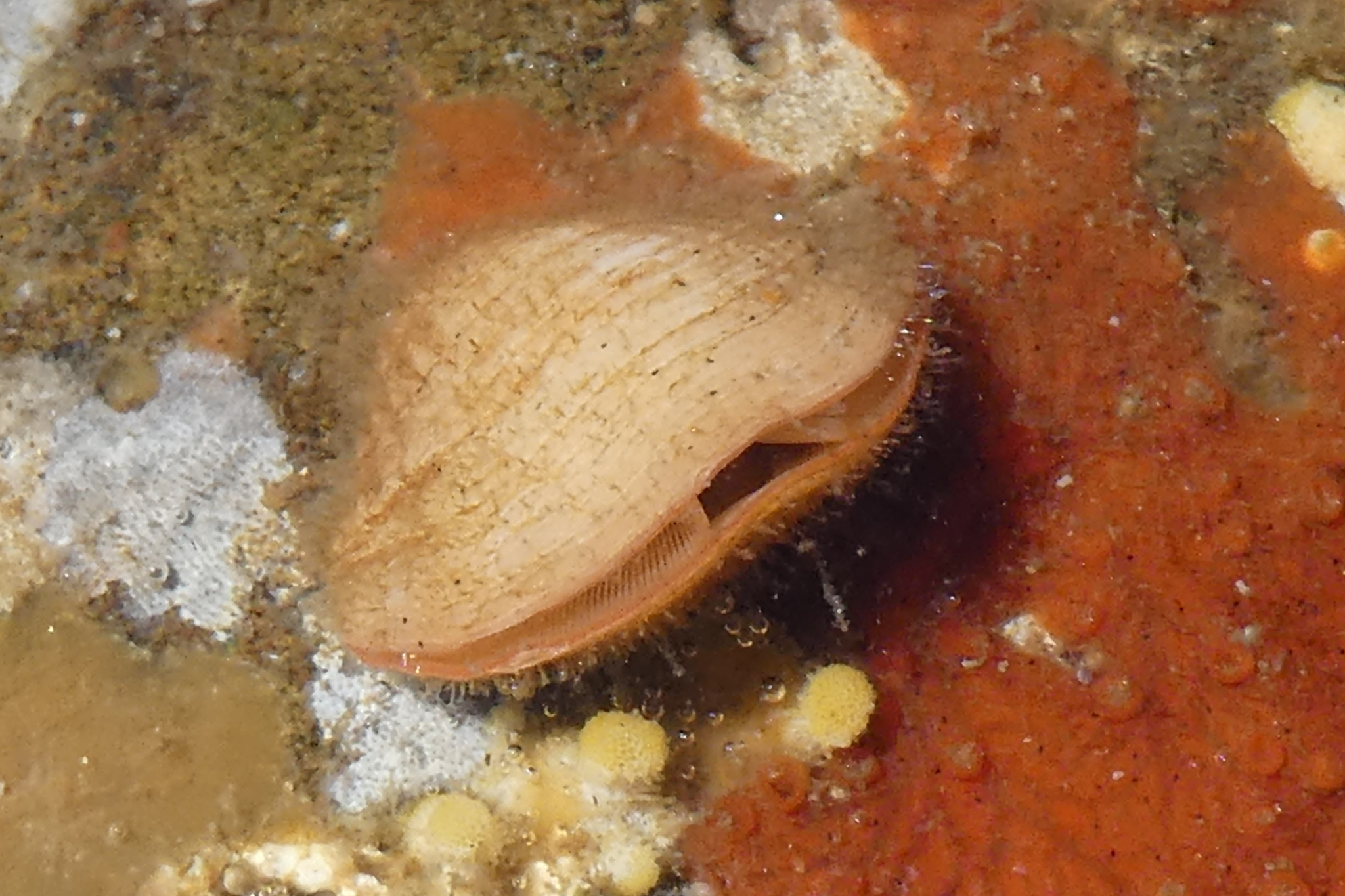
Terebratalia transversa. Order Terebratulida

Class Craniata

- Craniida
- Craniopsida †
- Trimerellida †

Subphylum Linguliformea

- Class Lingulata
  - Acrotretida †
  - Lingulida
  - Siphonotretida †
- Class Paterinata
  - Paterinida †

Subphylum Rhynchonelliformea

- Class Chileata
  - Chileida †
  - Dictyonellida †
- Class Kutorginata
  - Kutorginida †
- Class Obolellata
  - Naukatida †
  - Obolellida †
- Class Rhynchonellata
  - Athyridida †
  - Atrypida †
  - Orthida †
  - Protorthida †
  - Pentamerida †
  - Rhynchonellida
  - Spiriferida †
  - Terebratulida
  - Thecideida
- Class Strophomenata
  - Billingsellida †
  - Orthotetida †
  - Productida †
  - Strophomenida †

=== Phylum Bryozoa ===
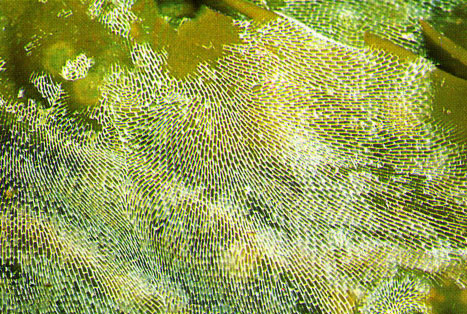
A colony of Membranipora membranacea. Order Cheilostomatida

Class Gymnolaemata

- Cheilostomata
- Ctenostomatida

Class Phylactolaemata

- Plumatellida

Class Stenolaemata

- Cyclostomatida
- Cryptostomata †
- Cystoporida †
- Esthonioporata †
- Fenestrida †
- Timanodictyina (Note: May be a suborder of Cryptostomata) †
- Trepostomatida †

=== Phylum Chaetognatha ===
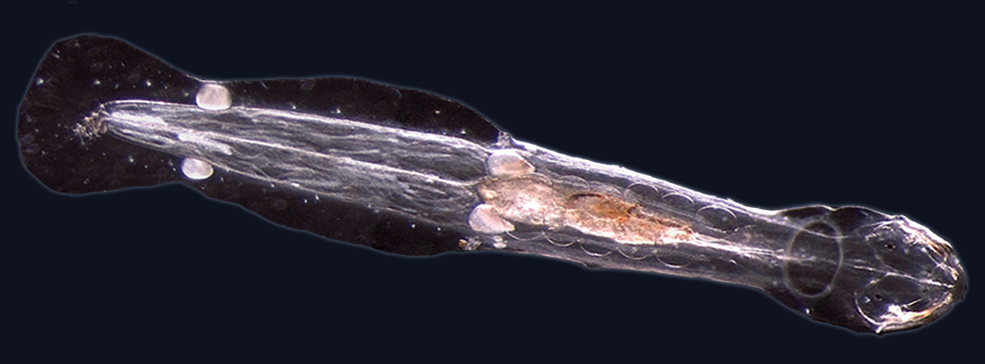
Spadella cephaloptera. Order Phragmophora

- Aphragmophora
- Phragmophora
- Protoconodonta †

Unplaced groups

- Genus Capinatator
- Genus Eognathacantha
- Genus Protodagitta
- Genus Timorebestia

=== Phylum Chordata ===
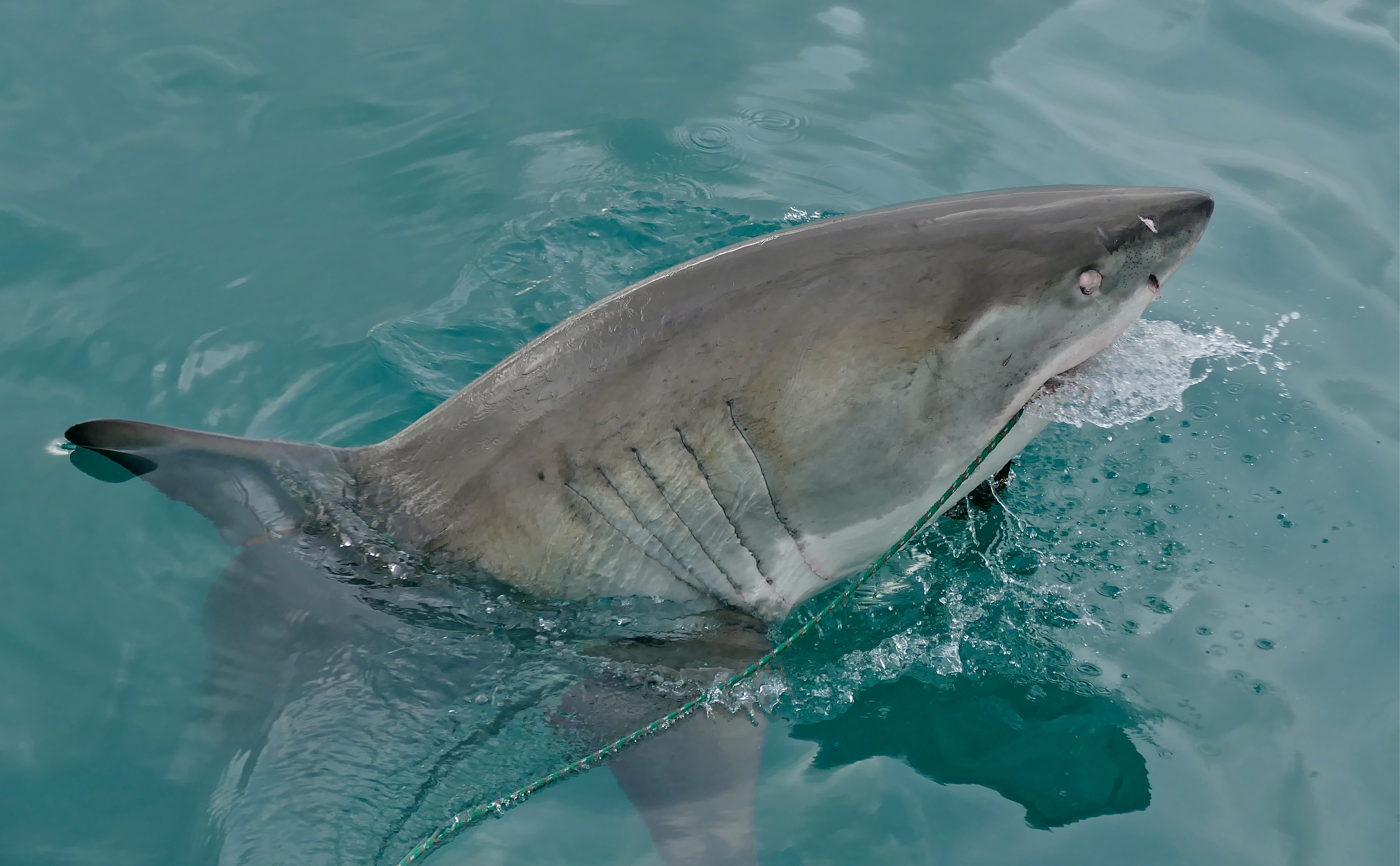
The great white shark. Order Lamniformes

See List of chordate orders

=== Phylum Cycliophora ===
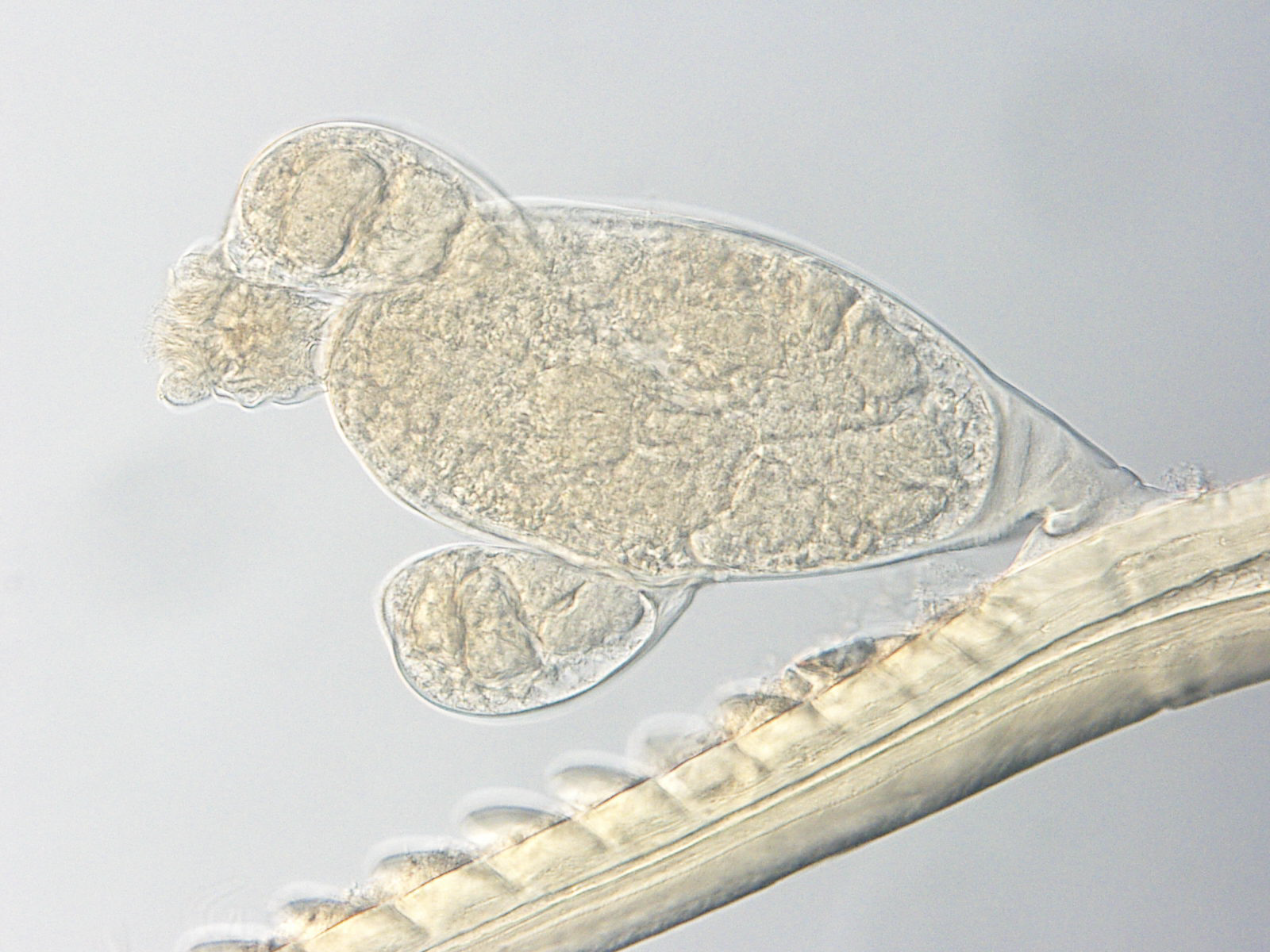
Symbion americanus. Order Symbiida

Class Eucycliophora

- Symbiida

=== Phylum Dicyemida ===
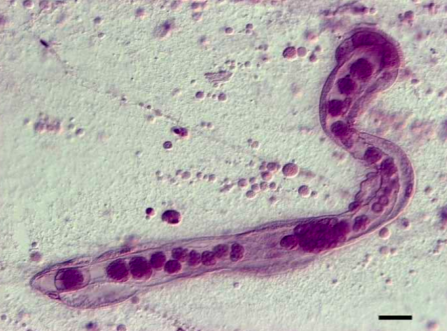
Dicyema japonicum

Dicyemida does not contain any established orders but does contain three families: Conocyemidae, Dicyemidae and Kantharellidae.

=== Phylum Echinodermata ===
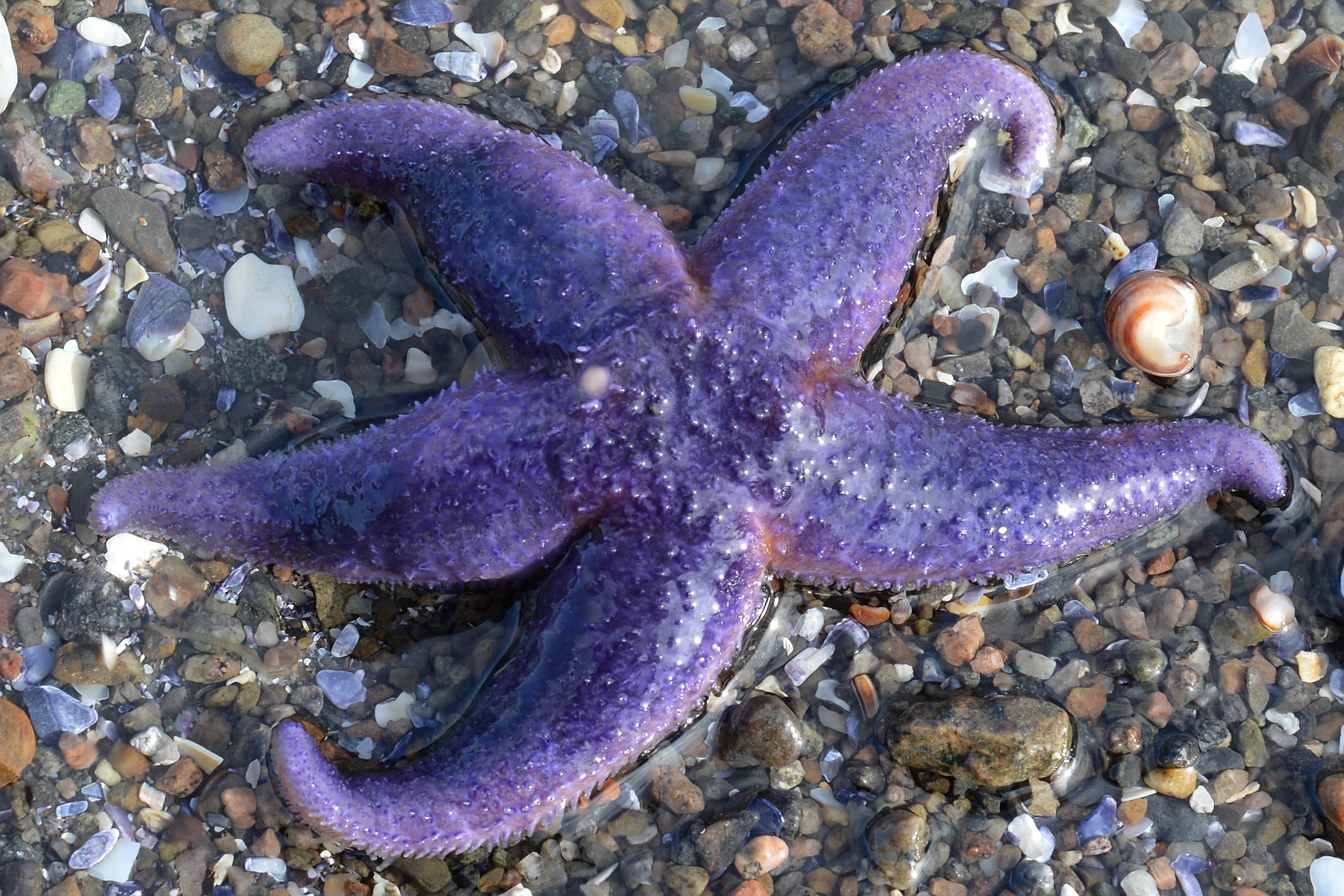
Asterias rubens. Order Forcipulatida

See List of echinoderm orders

=== Phylum Entoprocta ===
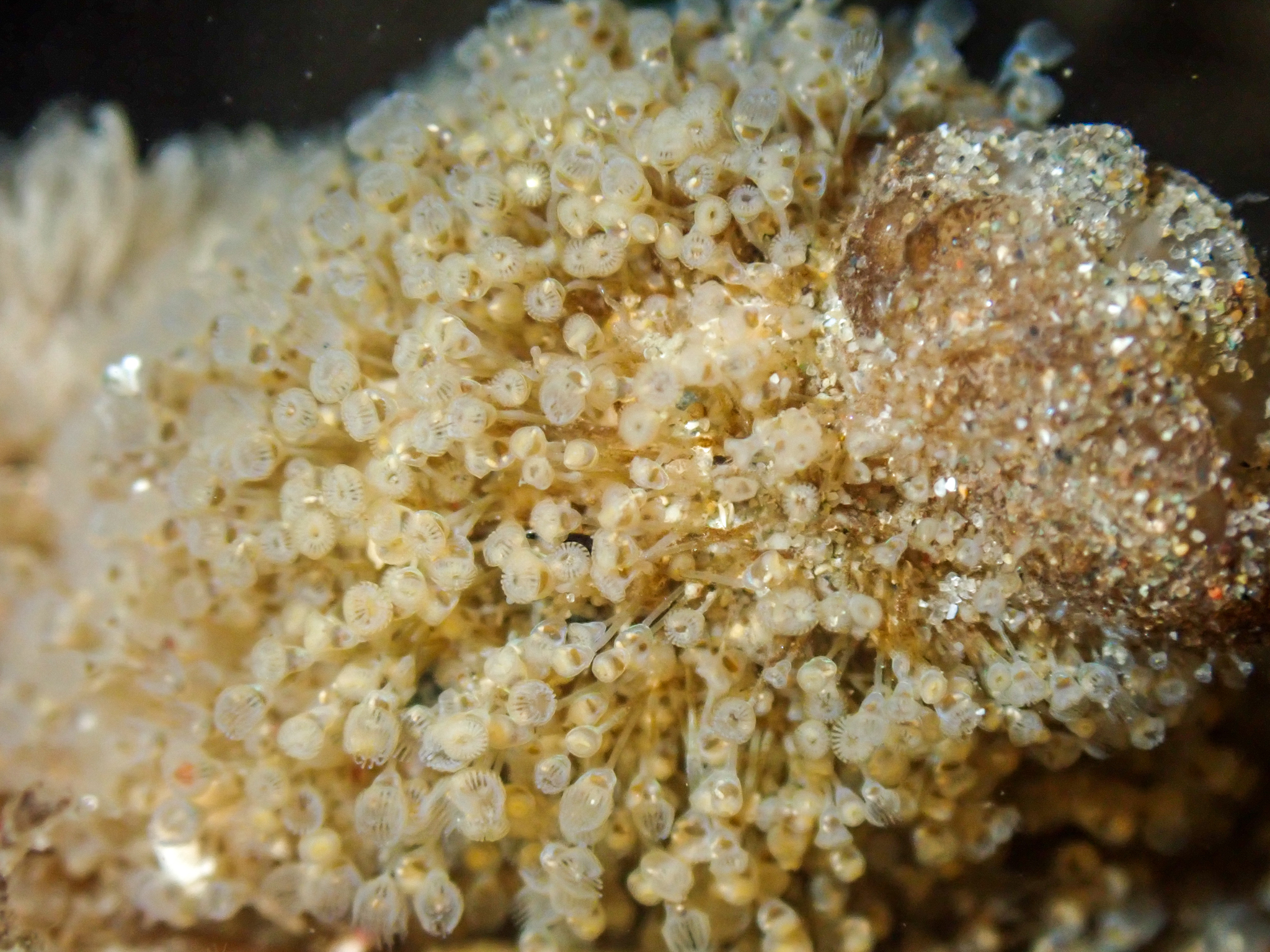
A colony of Barentsia ramosa

Entoprocta has no orders but is split into four families; Barentsiidae, Pedicellinidae, Loxokalypodidae, and Loxosomatidae.

=== Phylum Gastrotricha ===
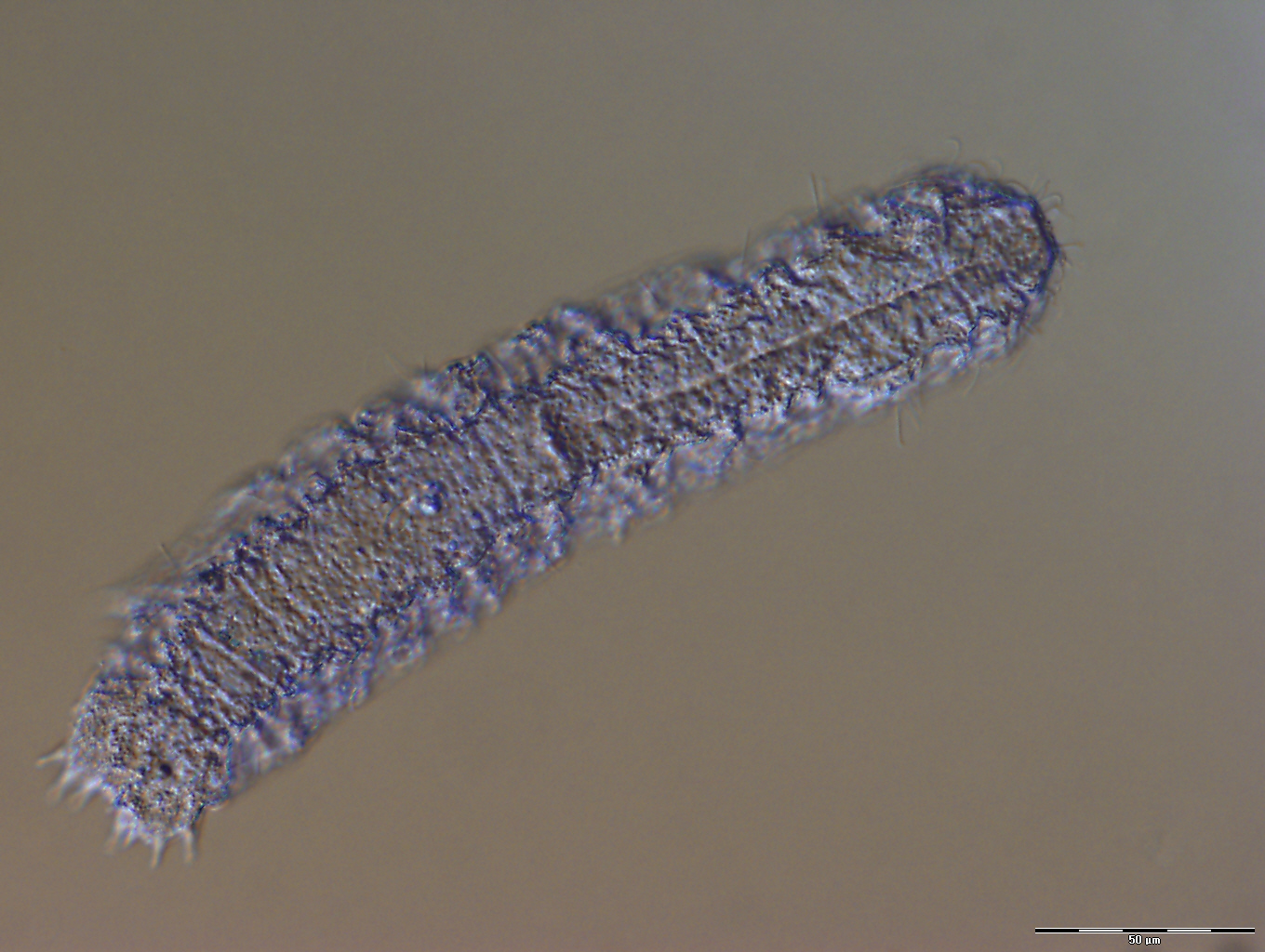
Paradasys subterraneus. Order Macrodasyida

- Chaetonotida
- Macrodasyida

=== Phylum Gnathostomulida ===
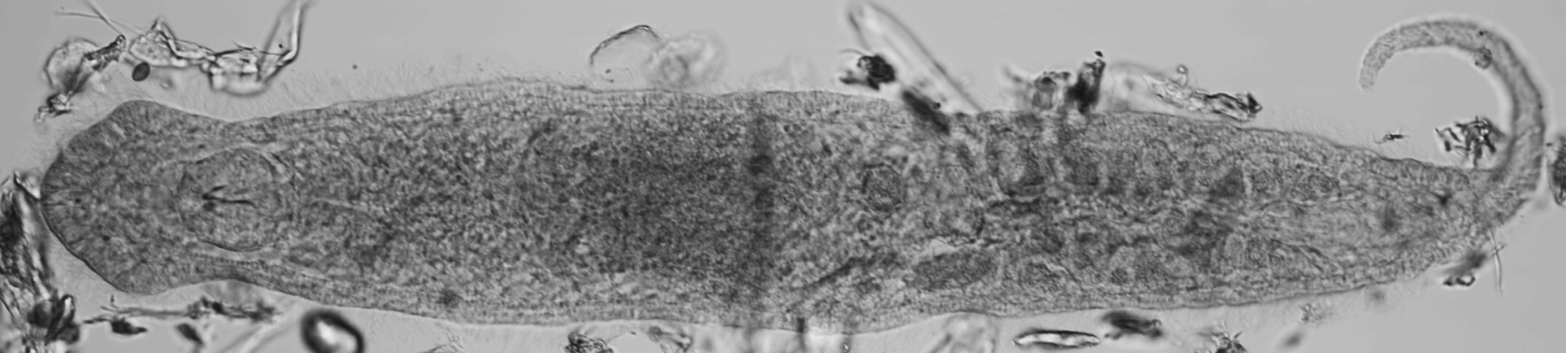
Gnathostomula paradoxa. Order Bursovaginoidea

- Bursovaginoidea
- Filospermoidea

=== Phylum Hemichordata ===
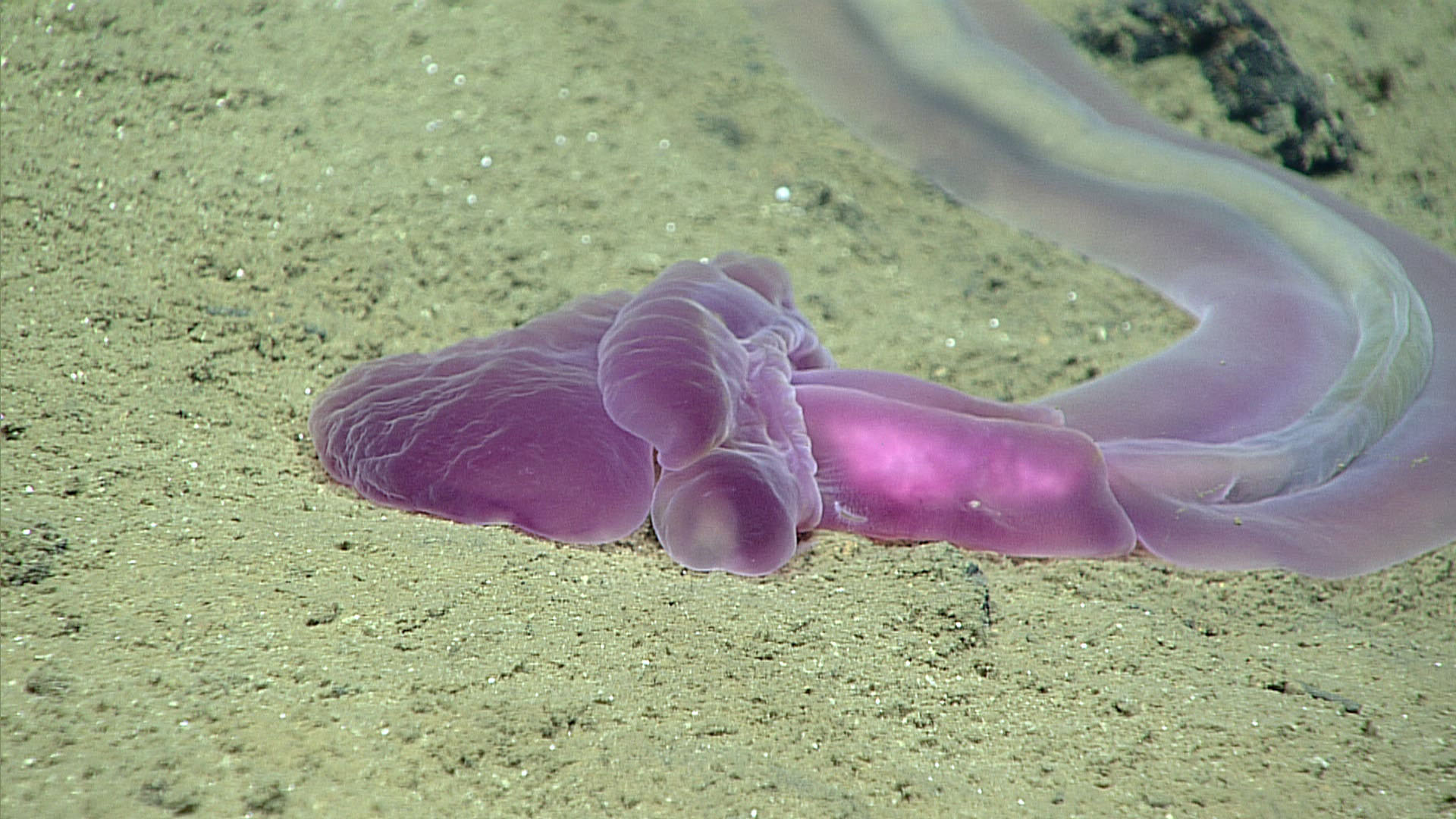
Unknown species of acorn worm (class Enteropneusta).

The classes Planctosphaeroidea and Enteropneusta do not contain any orders.

Class Pterobranchia

- Cephalodiscida
- Subclass Graptolithina
  - Rhabdopleurida
  - Dendroidea †
  - Graptoloidea †

Unplaced groups

- Family Cysticamaridae
- Family Wimanicrustidae
- Family Dithecodendridae
- Family Cyclograptidae

=== Phylum Kinorhyncha ===
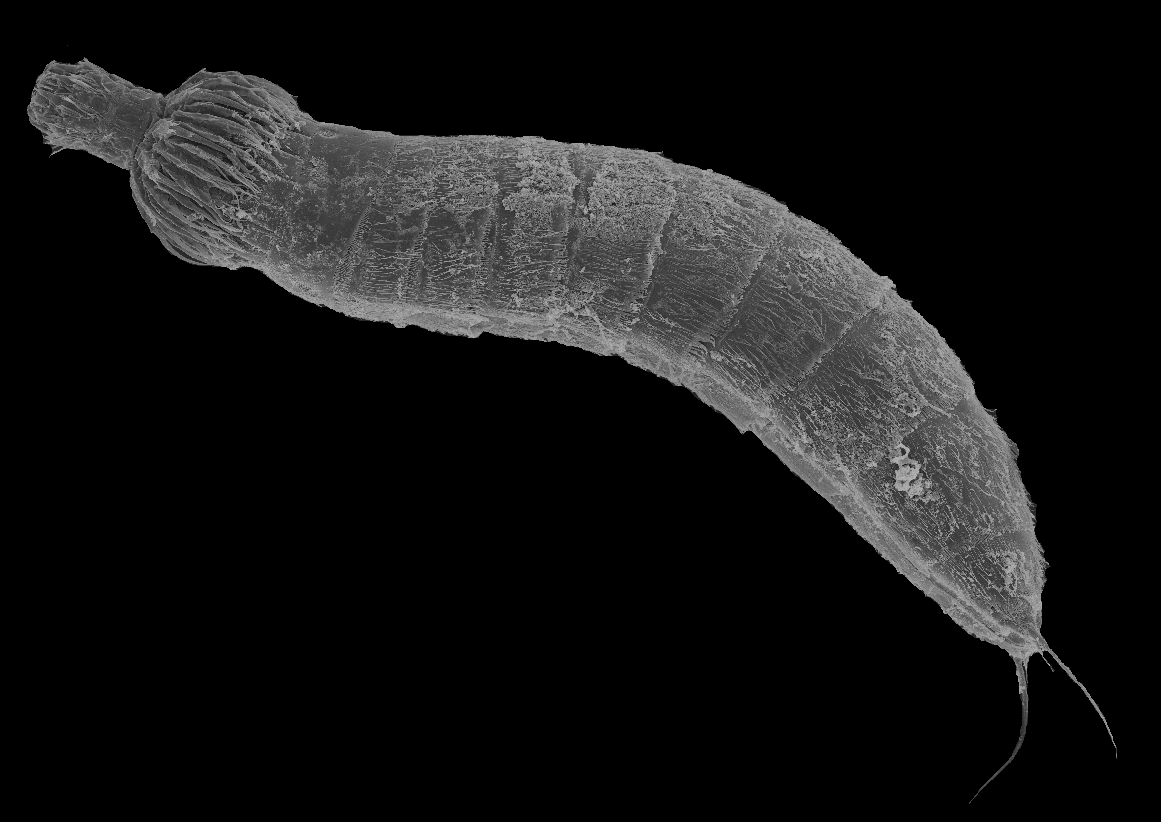
Echinoderes marthae. Order Echinorhagata

Class Cyclorhagida

- Echinorhagata
- Kentrorhagata
- Xenosomata

Class Allomalorhagida

- Anomoirhaga

Unplaced groups

- Genus Eokinorhynchus
- Family Pycnophyidae

=== Phylum Loricifera ===
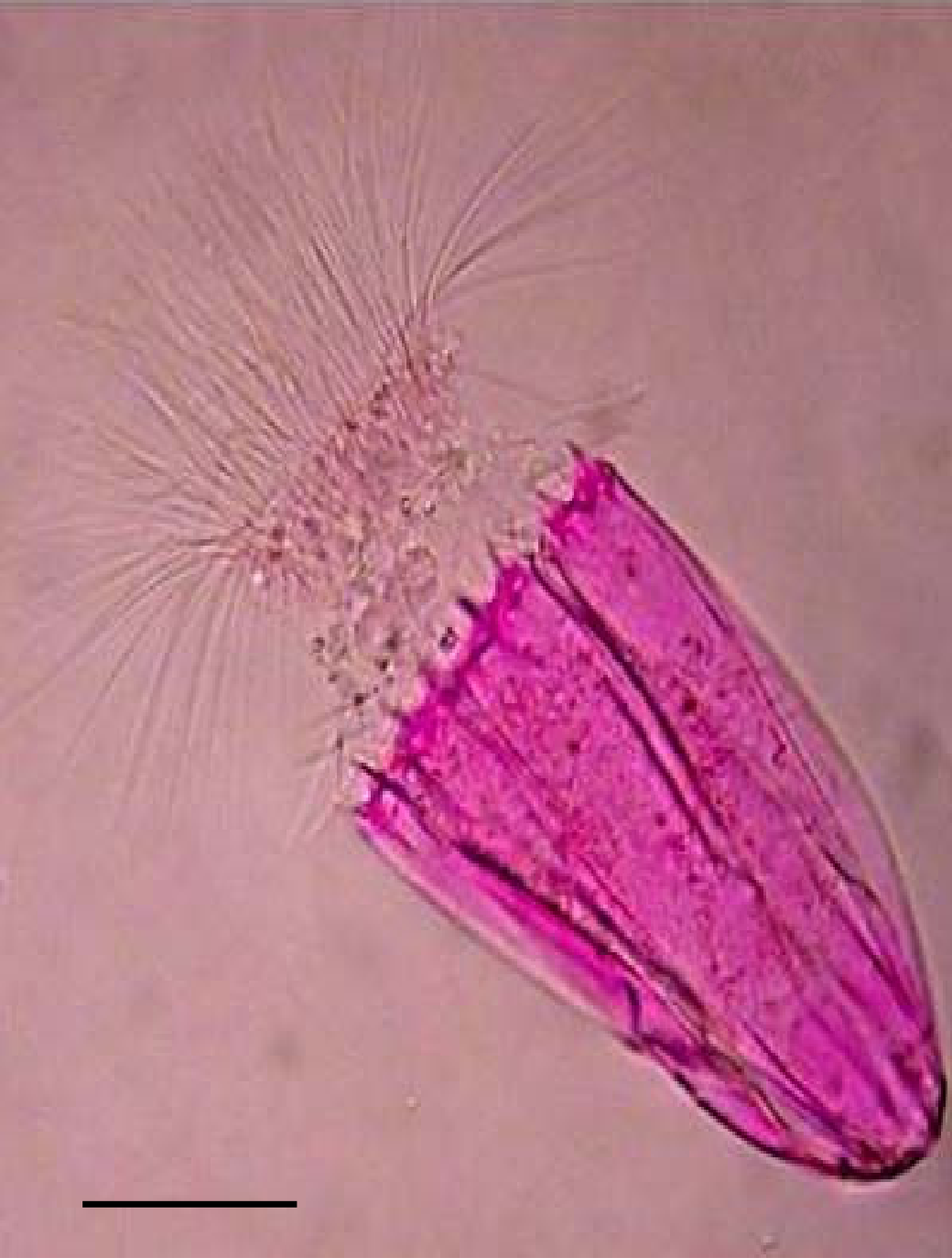
Spinoloricus cinziae. Order Nanaloricida

Loricifera has no classes and all species are contained within one order.

- Nanaloricida

=== Phylum Micrognathozoa ===
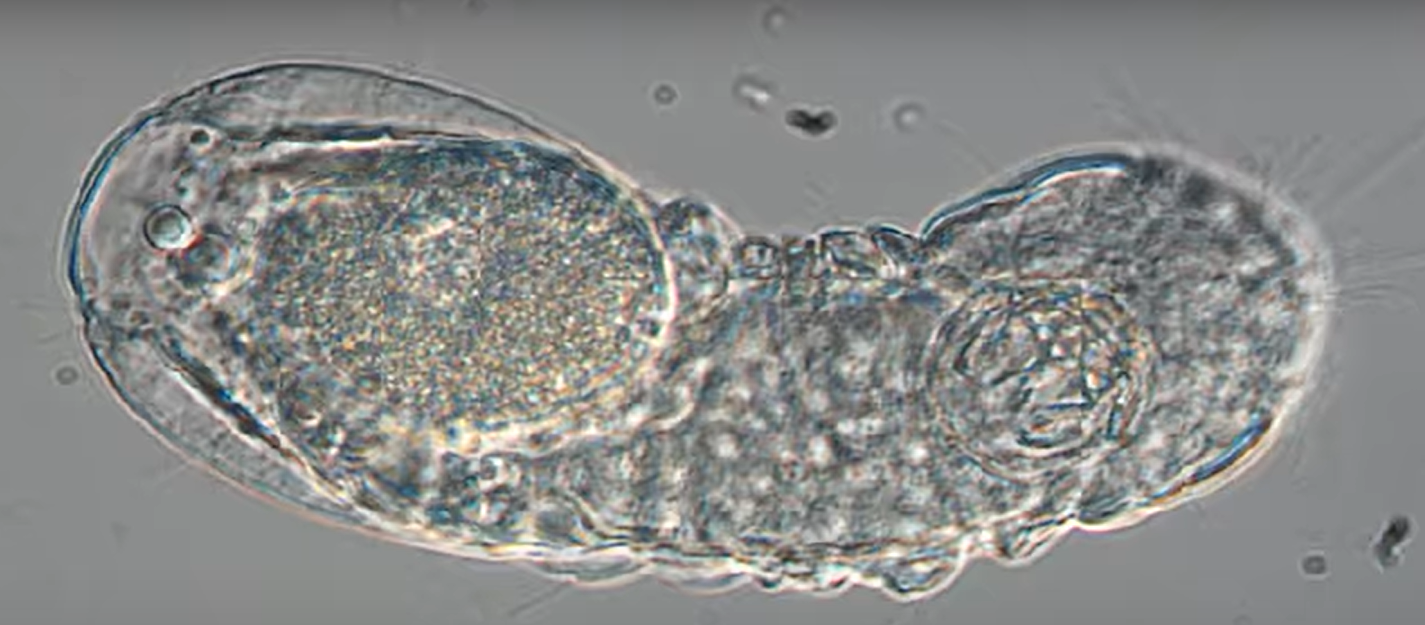
Limnognathia maerski. Order Limnognathida

Micrognathozoa has no classes. Its two species are placed in one order.

- Limnognathida

=== Phylum Mollusca ===
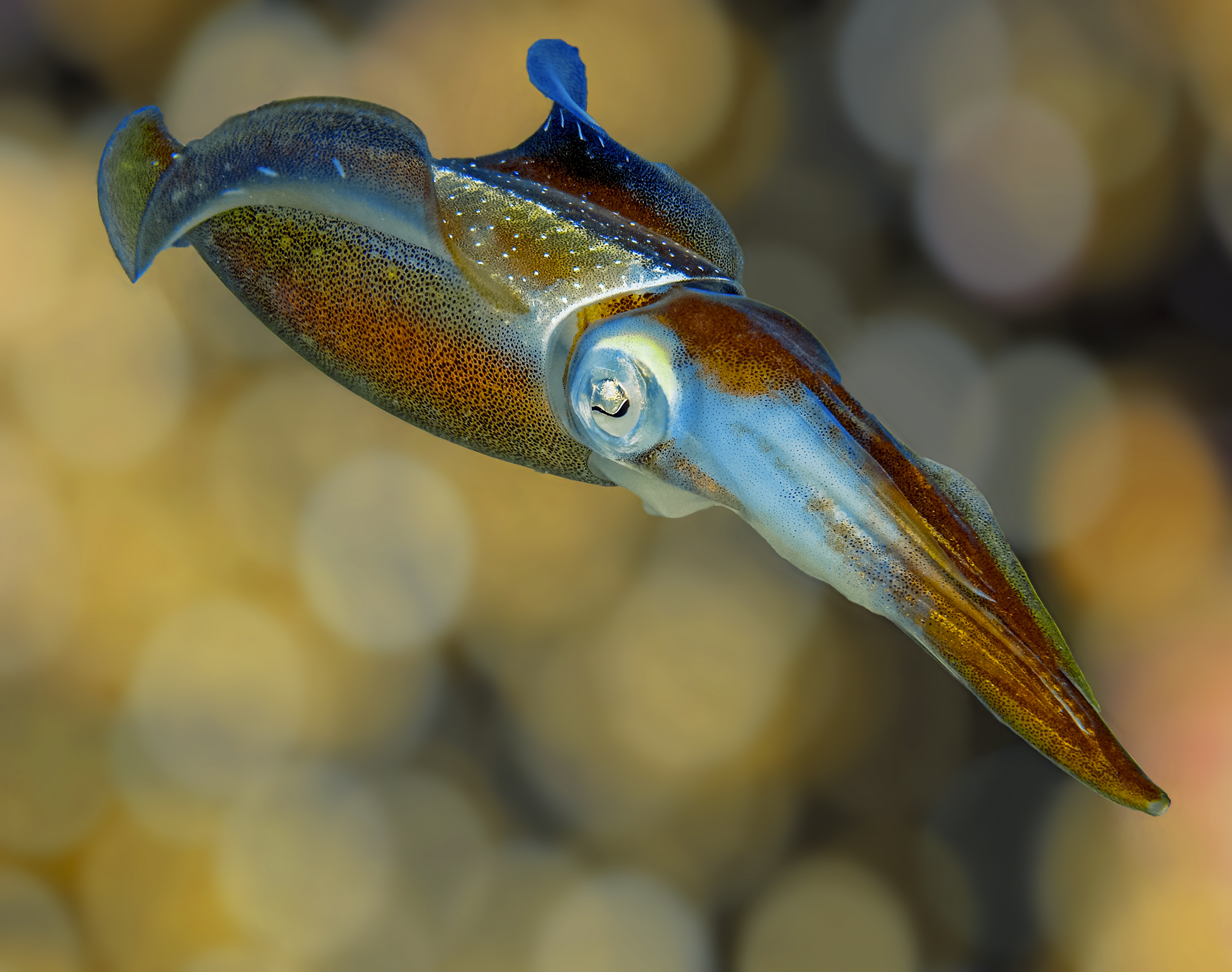
Sepioteuthis sepioidea. Order Myopsida

See List of mollusc orders

=== Phylum Nematoda ===
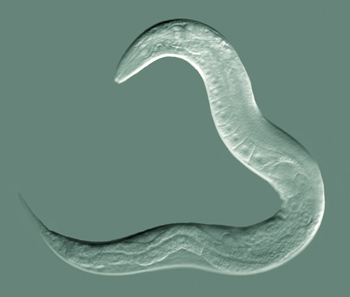
Caenorhabditis elegans. Order Rhabditida

Nematode taxonomy is far from fully resolved, and different schemes might be used. For this list, Mike Hodda's Phylum Nematoda: a classification, catalogue and index of valid genera, with a census of valid species classification is used.

Class Enoplea

- Subclass Enoplia
  - Superorder Enoplica
    - Alaimida
    - Enoplida
    - Ironida
    - Trefusiida
    - Tripyloidida
  - Superorder Rhaptothyreica
    - Rhaptothyreida
- Subclass Oncholaimia
  - Oncholaimida
- Subclass Triplonchia
  - Triplonchida
  - Tripylida

Class Dorylaimea

- Subclass Dorylaimia
  - Dorylaimida
- Subclass Bathyodontia
  - Bathyodontida
  - Mononchida
  - Mermithida
- Subclass Trichocephalia
  - Trichocephalida
  - Marimermithida
  - Dioctophymatida
  - Muspiceida

Class Chromadorea

- Subclass Chromadoria
  - Chromadorida
  - Selachinematida
  - Desmodorida
  - Desmoscolecida
- Subclass Plectia
  - Superorder Monhysterica
    - Monhysterida
  - Superorder Plectica
    - Leptolaimida
    - Plectida
    - Benthimermithida
  - Superorder Teratocephalica
    - Teratocephalida
  - Superorder Rhabditica
    - Diplogasterida
    - Rhabditida
    - Spirurida
    - Rhigonematida
    - Panagrolaimida
    - Drilonematida

=== Phylum Nematomorpha ===
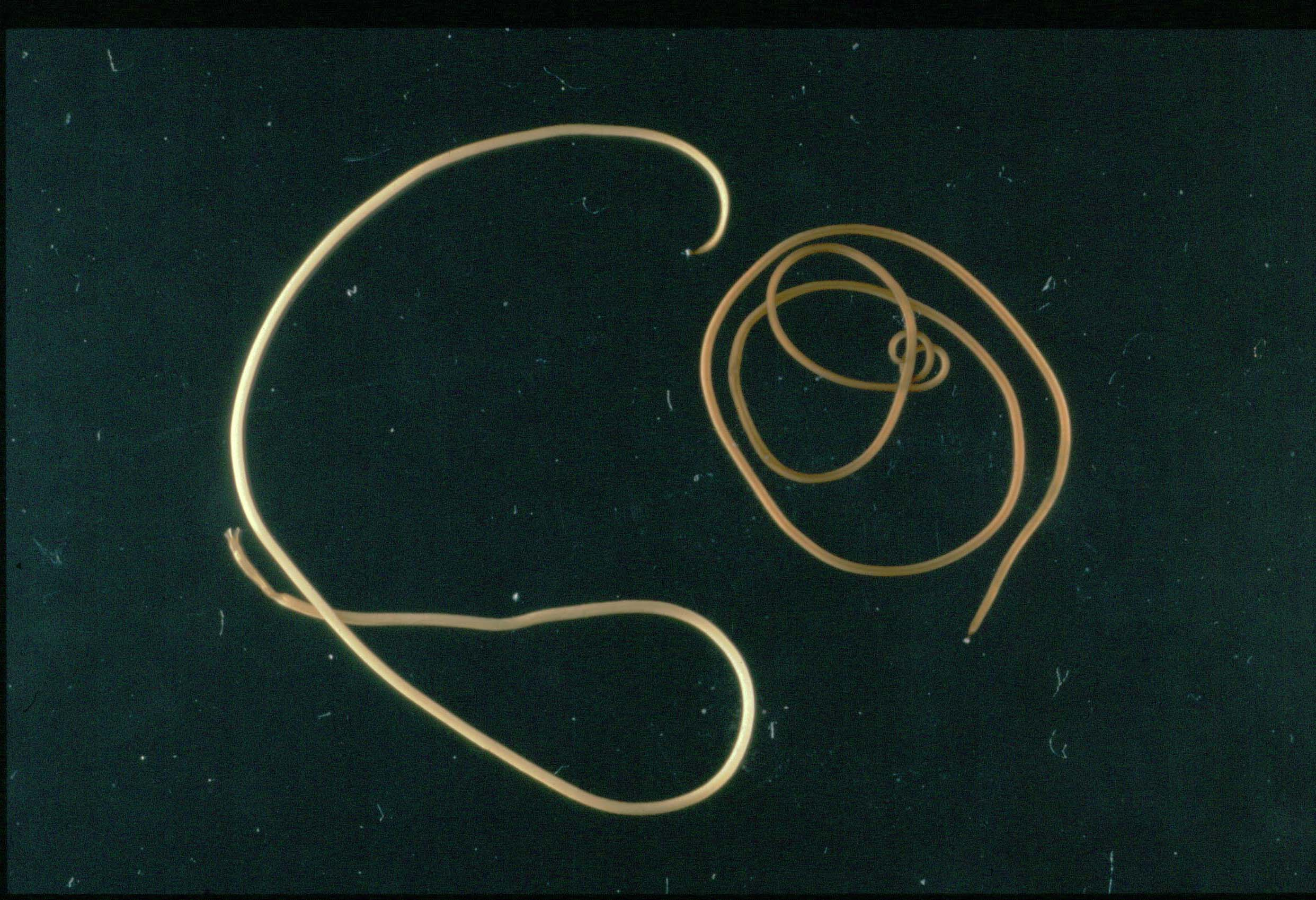
Paragordius tricuspidatus. Order Gordioidea

- Gordioidea
- Nectonematoidea

=== Phylum Nemertea ===
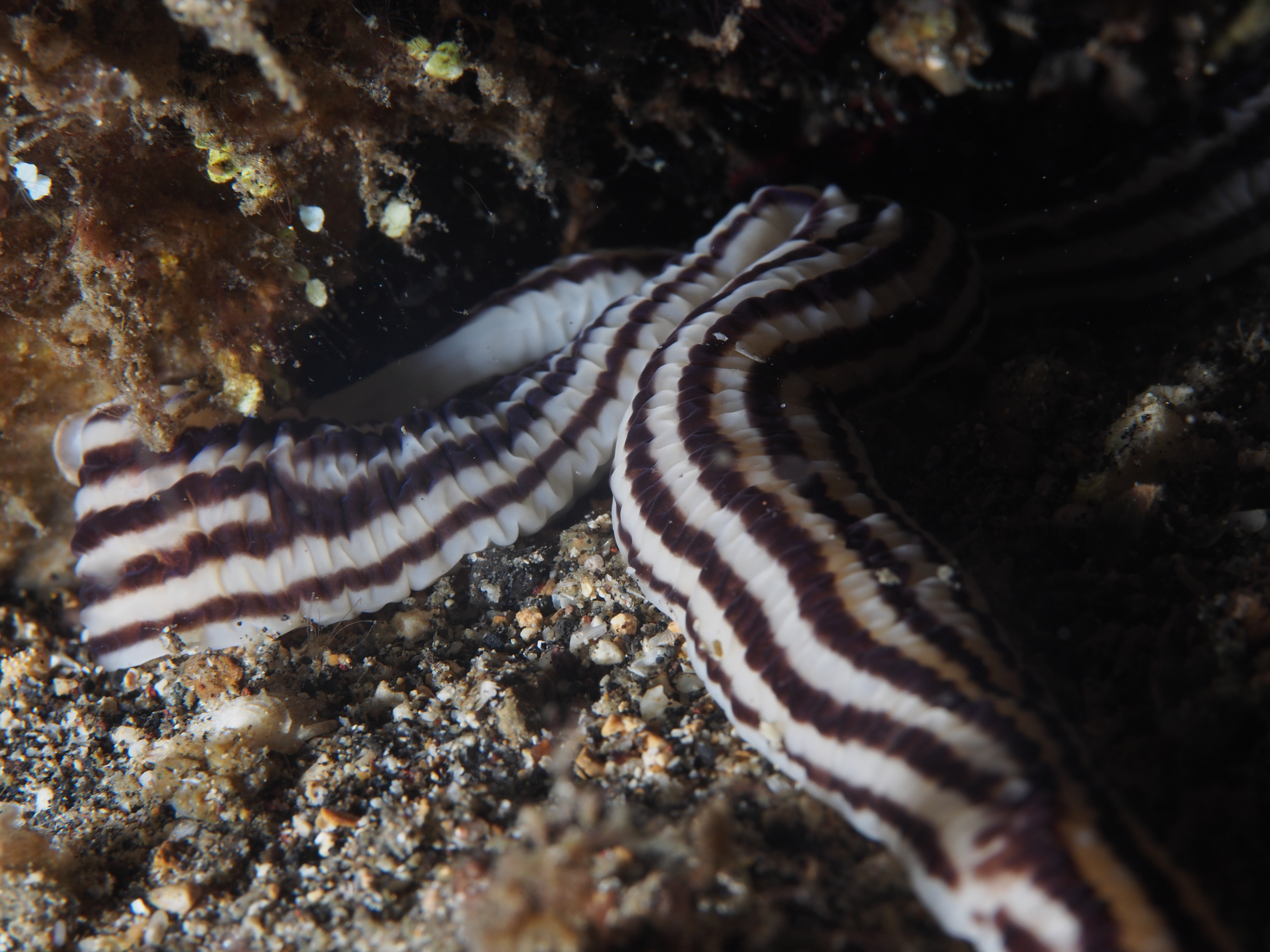
Baseodiscus quinquelineatus. Order Heteronemertea

Class Hoplonemertea

- Monostilifera
- Polystilifera

Class Palaeonemertea

- Archinemertea
- Carinomiformes
- Tubulaniformes

Class Pilidiophora

- Heteronemertea

=== Phylum Onychophora ===
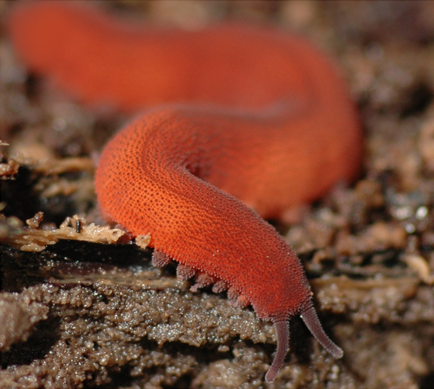
Epiperipatus biolleyi

Onychophora contains no classes and no orders, but is split into two living families; Peripatidae and Peripatopsidae, and 5 extinct genera; Antennacanthopodia, Antennipatus, Helenodora, Succinipatopsis, and Tertiapatus.

=== Phylum Orthonectida ===
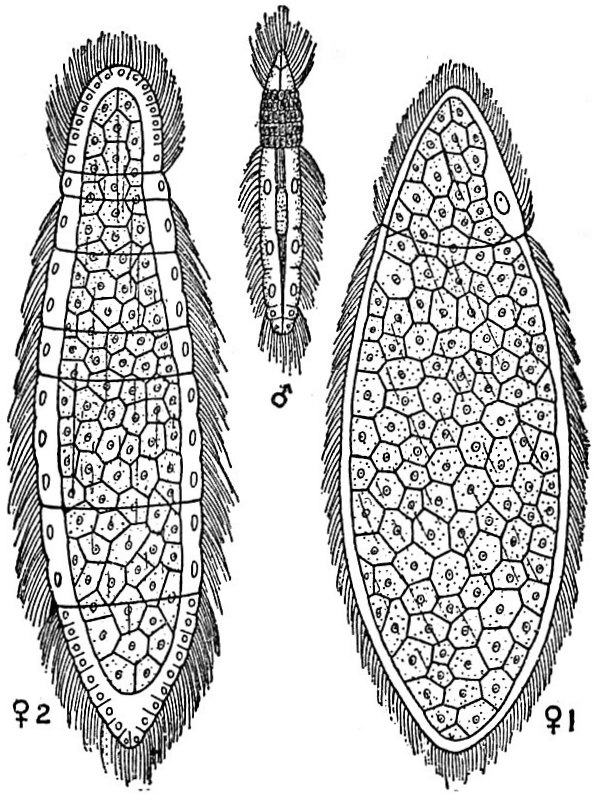
A drawing of Rhopalura giardii

Orthonectida contains no classes or orders, but is split into two families; Pelmatosphaeridae and Rhopaluridae.

=== Phylum Phoronida ===
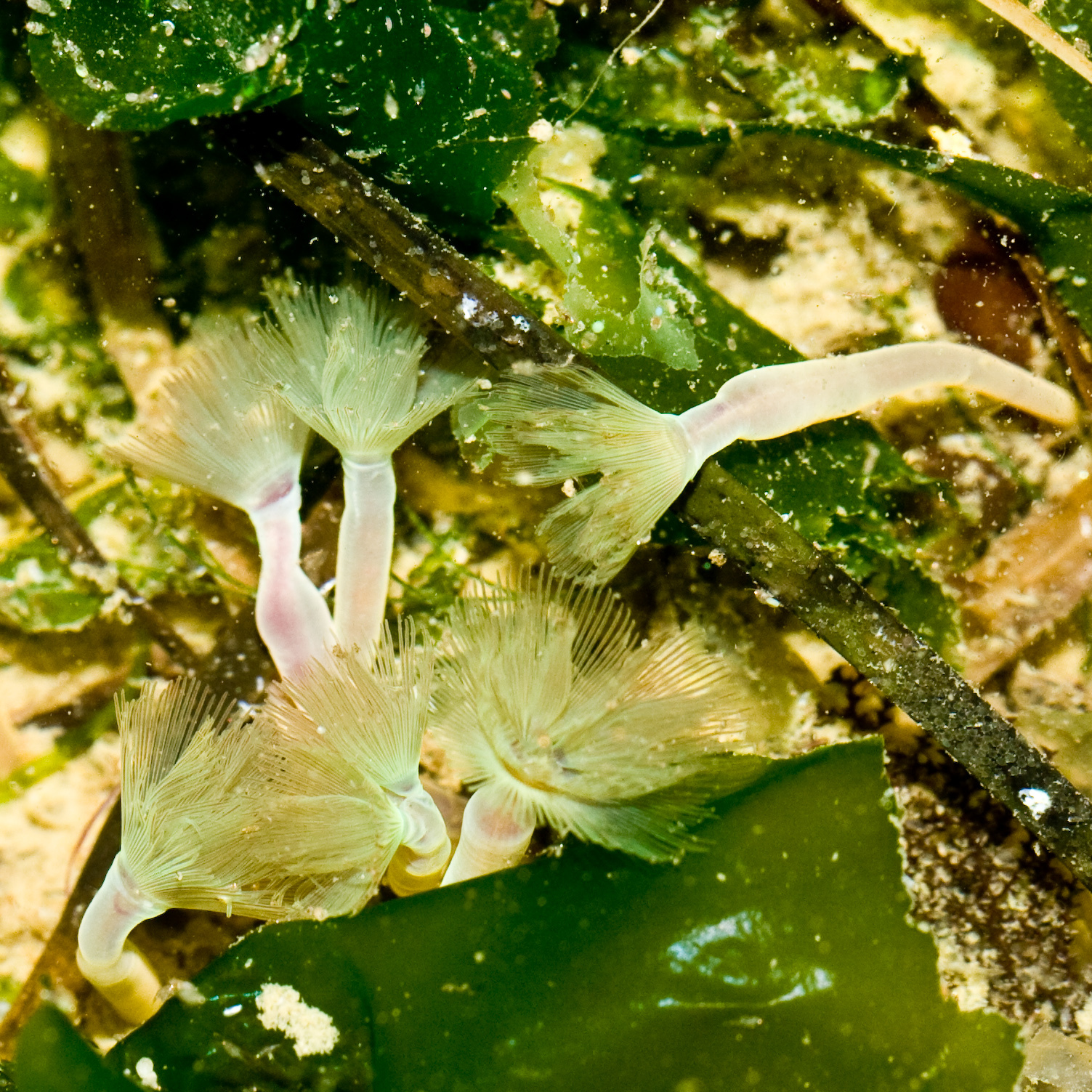
Phoronopsis harmeri

Phoronida contains no classes, orders, or families, but is split into two genera; Phoronis and Phoronopsis.

=== Phylum Platyhelminthes ===
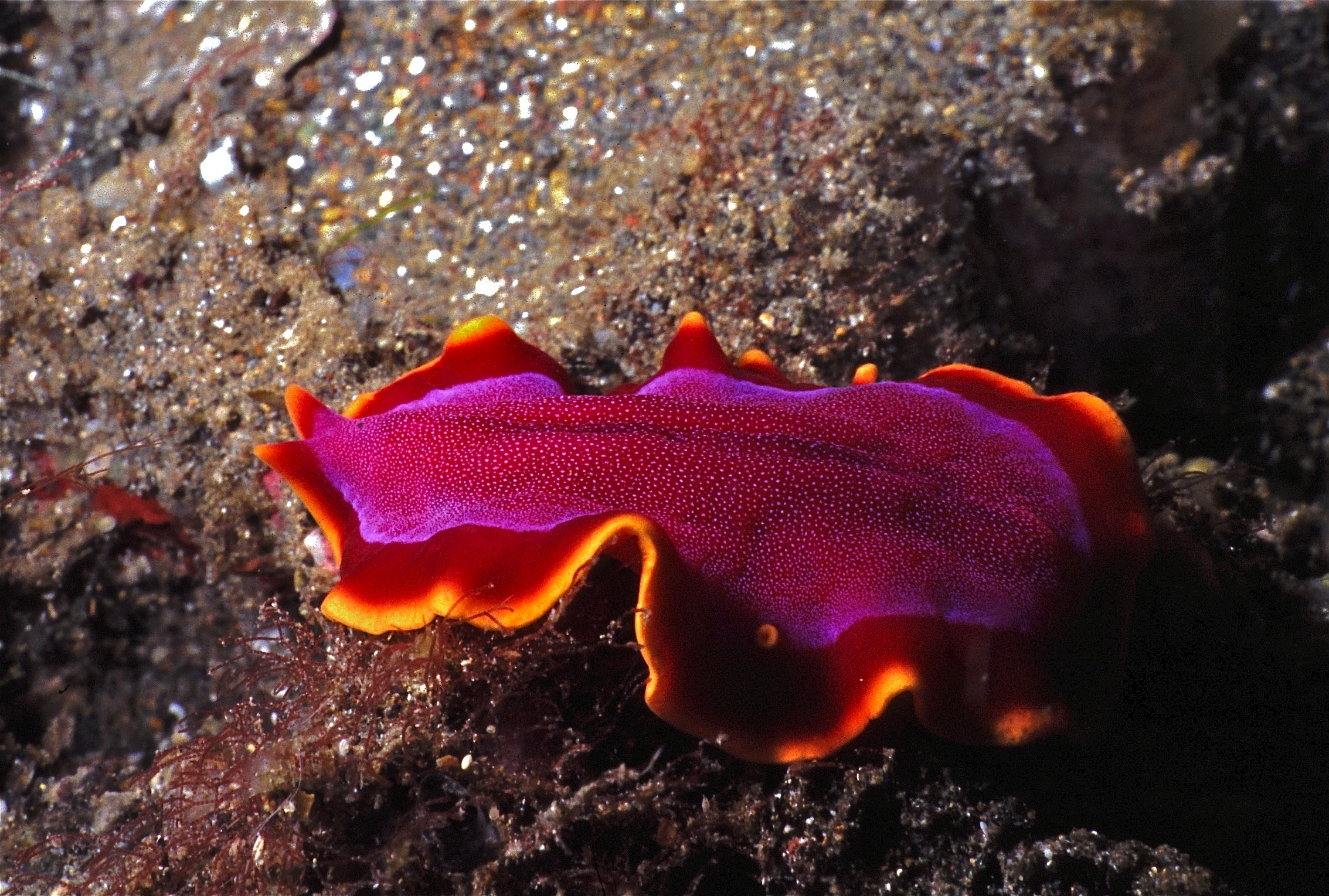
Pseudoceros ferrugineus. Order Polycladida

The class Catenulida contains no orders.

Subphylum Rhabditophora

- Clade Macrostomorpha
  - Macrostomida
- Clade Trepaxonemata
  - Gnosonesimida
  - Clade Amplimatricata
    - Lecithoepitheliata
    - Polycladida
  - Clade Euneoophora
    - Proseriata
    - Rhabdocoela
    - Clade Acentrosomata
      - Clade Adiaphanida
        - Prolecithophora
        - Fecampiida
        - Tricladida
      - Clade Bothrioneodermata
        - Bothrioplanida
        - Superclass Neodermata
          - Class Cestoda
            - Subclass Cestodaria
              - Amphilinidea
              - Gyrocotylidea
            - Subclass Eucestoda
              - Spathebothriidea
              - Caryophyllidea
              - Haplobothriidea
              - Diphyllobothriidea
              - Diphyllidea
              - Trypanorhyncha
              - Bothriocephalidea
              - Litobothriidea
              - Lecanicephaloidea
              - Rhinebothriidea
              - Tetraphyllidea
              - Onchoproteocephalidea
              - Nippotaeniidea
              - Tetrabothriidea
              - Cyclophyllidea
          - Class Monogenea
            - Subclass Monopisthocotylea
              - Monocotylidea
              - Capsalidea
              - Lagarocotylidea
              - Montchadskyellidea
              - Gyrodactylidea
              - Dactylogyridea
            - Subclass Polyopisthocotylea
              - Polystomatidea
              - Chimaericolidea
              - Diclybothriidea
              - Mazocraeidea
          - Class Trematoda
            - Subclass Aspidogastrea
              - Aspidogastrida
              - Stichocotylida
            - Subclass Digenea
              - Diplostomida
              - Plagiorchiida

Unplaced groups

- Genus Haplopharynx

=== Phylum Priapulida ===
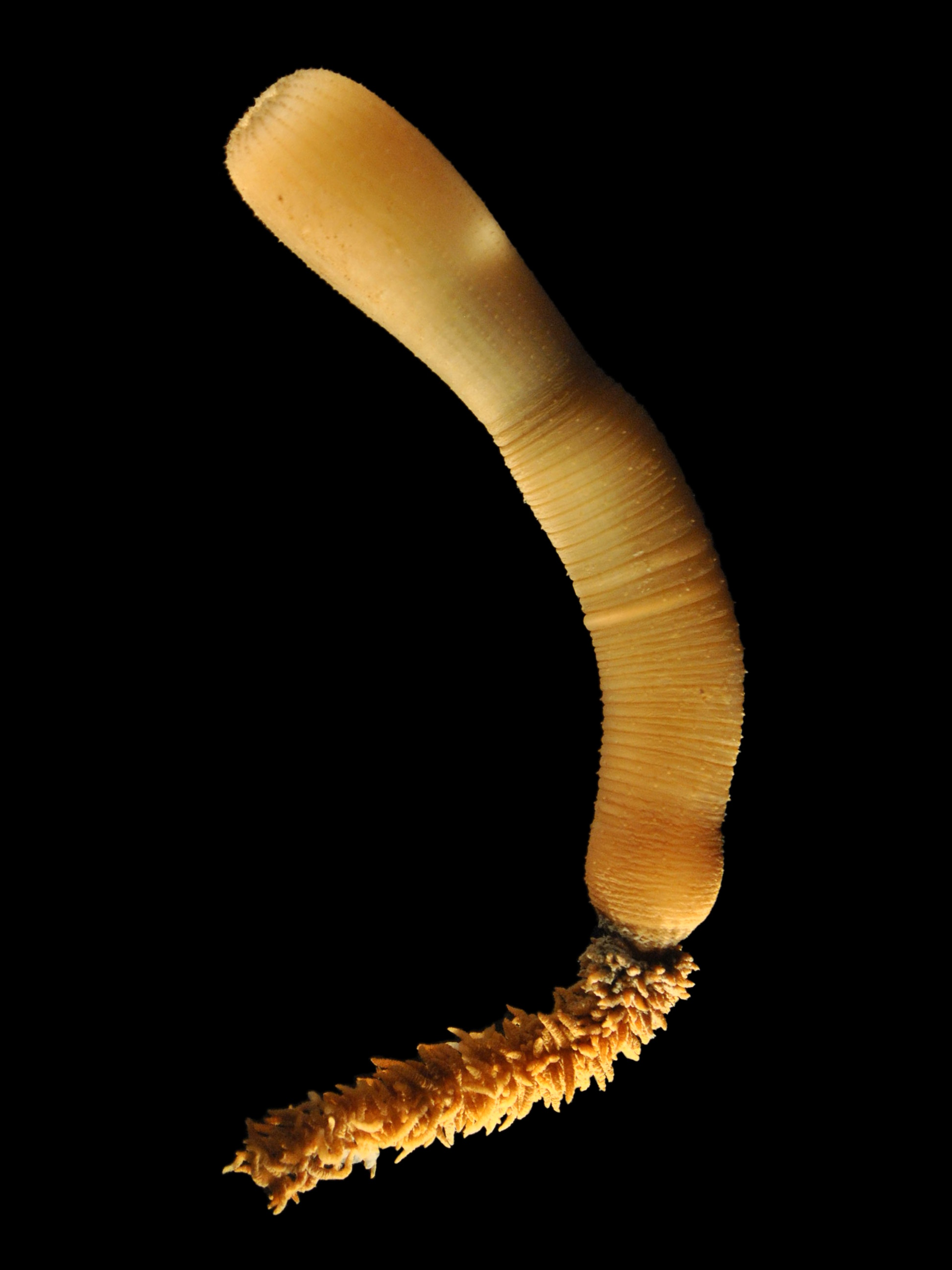
Priapulus caudatus. Order Priapulimorphida

Several stem group priapulid genera are not classified within any established orders. The orders listed below are solely crown priapulids.

- Halicryptomorphida
- Priapulimorphida
- Meiopriapulomorpha
- Seticoronaria (Note: Sometimes treated as a class)

=== Phylum Rotifera ===
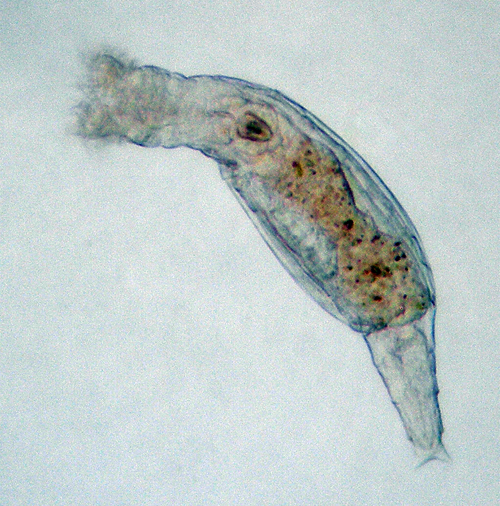
Habrotrocha rosa. Order Philodinida

The group Acanthocephala is traditionally treated as a separate phylum from Rotifera. However, it was found that Acanthocephala are phylogenetically contained within the rotifers, and this list reflects these findings.

- Seisonida

Superclass Eurotatoria

- Class Bdelloidea
  - Adinetida
  - Philodinavida
  - Philodinida
- Class Monogononta
  - Collothecaceae
  - Flosculariaceae
  - Ploima

Clade Acanthocephala

- Class Archiacanthocephala
  - Apororhynchida
  - Gigantorhynchida
  - Moniliformida
  - Oligacanthorhynchida
- Class Eoacanthocephala
  - Gyracanthocephala
  - Neoechinorhynchida
- Class Palaeacanthocephala
  - Echinorhynchida
  - Heteramorphida
  - Polymorphida
- Polyacanthorhynchida

=== Phylum Tardigrada ===
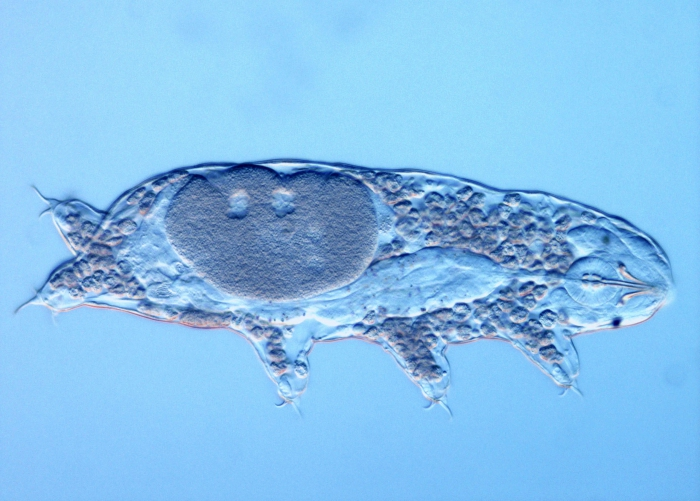
Acutuncus antarcticus. Order Parachela

The class Mesotardigrada contains one species, Thermozodium esakii, which has not been found since its reported discovery in 1937, and its existence is dubious. It is contained within the order Thermozodia.

- Class Eutardigrada
  - Apochela
  - Parachela
- Class Heterotardigrada
  - Arthrotardigrada
  - Echiniscoidea

=== Phylum Xenacoelomorpha ===
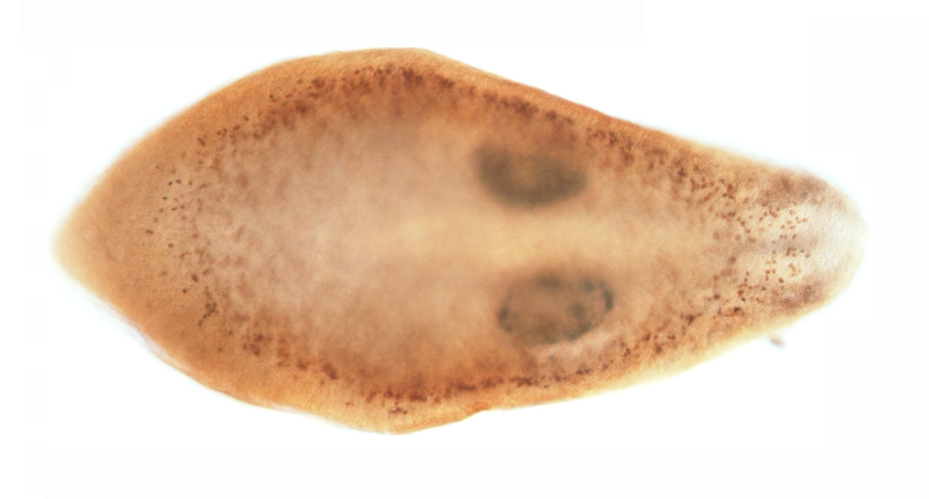
Neochildia fusca. Order Acoela

The subphylum Xenoturbellida does not contain any classes or orders. Its only family is Xenoturbellidae which contains one genus, Xenoturbella.

- Subphylum Acoelomorpha
  - Acoela

The class Nemertodermatida does not contain any orders, but does contain two families; Ascopariidae and Nemertodermatidae.
