= Spathebothriidae =

Scientific classification
- Kingdom: Animalia
- Phylum: Platyhelminthes
- Class: Cestoda
- Order: Spathebothriidea
- Family: Spathebothriidae

Family of flatworms

Spathebothriidae is a family of flatworms belonging to the order Spathebothriidea.

Genera:

- Spathebothrium Linton, 1922
