= Acrobothriidae =

Scientific classification
- Kingdom: Animalia
- Phylum: Platyhelminthes
- Class: Cestoda
- Order: Spathebothriidea
- Family: Acrobothriidae

Family of flatworms

Acrobothriidae is a family of flatworms belonging to the order Spathebothriidea.

Genera:

- Bothrimonus Duvernoy, 1842
- Cyathocephalus Kessler, 1868
- Didymobothrium Nybelin, 1922
- Diplocotyle Diesing, 1850
- Diplocotyle Krabbe, 1874
