= Echinobothriidae =

Scientific classification
- Kingdom: Animalia
- Phylum: Platyhelminthes
- Class: Cestoda
- Order: Diphyllidea
- Family: Echinobothriidae

Family of flatworms

Echinobothriidae is a family of flatworms belonging to the order Diphyllidea.

Genera:

- Ahamulina Marques, Jensen & Caira, 2012
- Andocadoncum Abbott & Caira, 2014
- Coronocestus Caira, Marques, Jensen, Kuchta & Ivanov, 2013
- Ditrachybothridium Rees, 1959
- Echinobothrium Van Beneden, 1849
- Halysioncum Caira, Marques, Jensen, Kuchta & Ivanov, 2013
