= Mesocestoides =

Scientific classification
- Kingdom: Animalia
- Phylum: Platyhelminthes
- Class: Cestoda
- Order: Cyclophyllidea
- Family: Mesocestoididae
- Genus: Mesocestoides; Vaillant, 1863

Synonyms
- Monodoridium Walter, 1866; Ptychophysa Hamann, 1885; Ptychophyta Hamann, 1885

Genus of flatworms

Mesocestoides is a genus of flatworms belonging to the family Mesocestoididae.

The genus has cosmopolitan distribution.

Species:

- Mesocestoides alaudae Stossich, 1896
- Mesocestoides ambiguus Vaillant, 1863
- Mesocestoides angustatus (Rudolphi, 1819)
- Mesocestoides canislagopodis (Rudolphi, 1810)
- Mesocestoides corti Hoeppli, 1925
- Mesocestoides imbutiformis (Polonio, 1860)
- Mesocestoides leptothylacus Loos-Frank, 1980
- Mesocestoides lineatus (Goeze, 1782)
- Mesocestoides litteratus (Batsch, 1786)
- Mesocestoides melesi Yanchev & Petrov, 1985
- Mesocestoides perlatus (Goeze, 1782)
- Mesocestoides petrowi Sadychov, 1971
- Mesocestoides zacharovae Chertkova & Kosupko, 1975
