= Nippotaeniidae =

Scientific classification
- Kingdom: Animalia
- Phylum: Platyhelminthes
- Class: Cestoda
- Order: Nippotaeniidea
- Family: Nippotaeniidae; Yamaguti, 1939

Family of flatworms

Nippotaeniidae is a family of flatworms belonging to the order Nippotaeniidea.

Genera:

- Nippotaenia Yamaguti, 1939
