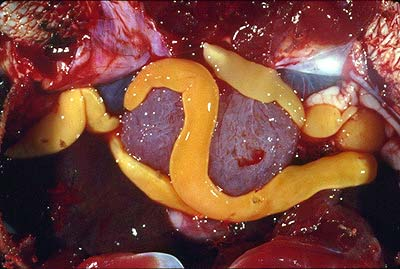
- Adults of Australamphilina elongata in body cavity of freshwater turtle.

Scientific classification
- Kingdom: Animalia
- Phylum: Platyhelminthes
- Class: Cestoda
- Subclass: Cestodaria

Orders
- Amphilinidea; Gyrocotylidea

= Cestodaria =

Subclass of cestodes

Cestodaria is a likely paraphyletic subclass of the class Cestoda along with Eucestoda. The Cestodaria subclass is made up of Amphilinidea and Gyrocotylidea. Unlike Eucestoda, the larvae have ten hooks on the posterior end and are unsegmented.
