= Mesocestoididae =

Scientific classification
- Kingdom: Animalia
- Phylum: Platyhelminthes
- Class: Cestoda
- Order: Cyclophyllidea
- Family: Mesocestoididae

Genera
- Mesocestoides; Mesogyna

Family of flatworms

Mesocestoididae is a family of Cestoda (tapeworms) in the order Cyclophyllidea. Members of this family are gut parasites of small mammals and occasionally birds.

== Genera ==
Two genera are recognised, Mesocestoides and Mesogyna.
