= Heterocyemida =

Scientific classification
- Domain: Eukaryota
- Kingdom: Animalia
- Phylum: Dicyemida
- Order: Heterocyemida

Order of parasites of cephalopods

Heterocyemida is an order of parasites which dwell in the renal appendages of cephalopods.
