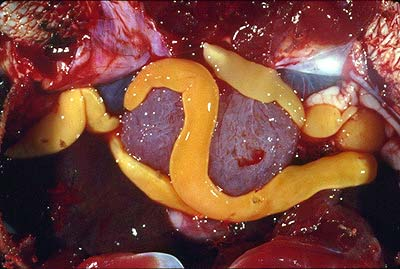

Scientific classification
- Kingdom: Animalia
- Phylum: Platyhelminthes
- Class: Cestoda
- Order: Amphilinidea
- Family: Amphilinidae
- Genus: Australamphilina
- Species: A. elongata

Binomial name
- Australamphilina elongata Johnson, 1831

Synonyms
- (Species): Gigantolina elongata

= Australamphilina =

Australamphilina elongata

Genus of flatworm

Australamphilina elongata is a species of parasitic worm in the order Amphilinidea. Amphilinids are commonly considered to be tapeworms, yet differ from true tapeworms, subclass Eucestoda, because their bodies are unsegmented and are not divided into proglottids. It is an internal parasite of freshwater turtles including the eastern long-necked turtle (Chelodina longicollis). It is found in eastern Australia. It is the only species in the genus Australamphilina.

== Description ==
Unlike other tapeworms, the body of amphilinids is not divided into segments, instead being leaf-shaped and laterally flattened. There is a proboscis and several frontal glands at the anterior end, and an ovary and a seminal receptacle at the posterior end. The uterus extends from the posterior end, forward to the anterior end, back to the posterior end and then forward again to the anterior end, before opening at the female gonopore. Small testes and yolk cells are scattered throughout most of the tissue. The male gonopore is at the posterior end, and there is no gut. The larvae have ten wrench-shaped hooks and these are retained at the posterior end of the adult body.

A. elongata is bright yellow and can grow to a length of 150 mm (6 in) and a width of 15 mm (0.6 in).

== Life cycle ==
The adult stage of this tapeworm is found in the body cavity of the eastern long-necked turtle (Chelodina longicollis), and there may be as many as thirty worms in one turtle host. It is uncertain how the worm's eggs are released into the open water, but somehow they do emerge. When the eggs hatch, the developing larvae seek out an intermediate host, a suitable freshwater crayfish, and penetrate its cuticle by chemical action and by sawing through the shell with miniature hooks. The young tapeworm then continues its development in the crustacean, and if the crayfish is eaten by a turtle, the larva forces its way through the turtle's oesophagus into the turtle's body cavity.
