= Rugosusivitta =

Rugosusivitta Temporal range: Cambrian

Scientific classification
- Kingdom: Animalia
- Clade: Bilateria
- Genus: †Rugosusivitta; Song et al., 2020
- Species: †R. orthogonia

Binomial name
- †Rugosusivitta orthogonia Song et al., 2020

Enigmatic Cambrian fossil genus

Rugosusivitta orthogonia is a fossil ribbon-shaped bilaterian, found just above the Ediacaran-Cambrian line in Yunnan. It has been interpreted as a stem group to Platyhelminthes. It shares similarities with present-day Cestodians.
