= Proteocephalidea =

Scientific classification
- Kingdom: Animalia
- Phylum: Platyhelminthes
- Class: Cestoda
- Subclass: Eucestoda
- Order: Proteocephalidea

Order of flatworms

Proteocephalidea is an order of tapeworms which includes the Proteocephalidae family.
