= Haplobothriidea =

Scientific classification
- Kingdom: Animalia
- Phylum: Platyhelminthes
- Class: Cestoda
- Subclass: Eucestoda
- Order: Haplobothriidea

Subgroups
- See text.

Order of flatworms

Haplobothriidea is an order of Cestoda (tapeworms). The two species of this order, both in the genus Haplobothrium, are gut parasites of Amia calva, the bowfin. The intermediate hosts are freshwater teleosts.
