= Spathebothriidea =

Scientific classification
- Kingdom: Animalia
- Phylum: Platyhelminthes
- Class: Cestoda
- Subclass: Eucestoda
- Order: Spathebothriidea

Families
- Acrobothriidae; Spathebothriidae

Order of flatworms

Spathebothriidea is an order of Cestoda (tapeworms). Members of this order are gut parasites of fishes.
