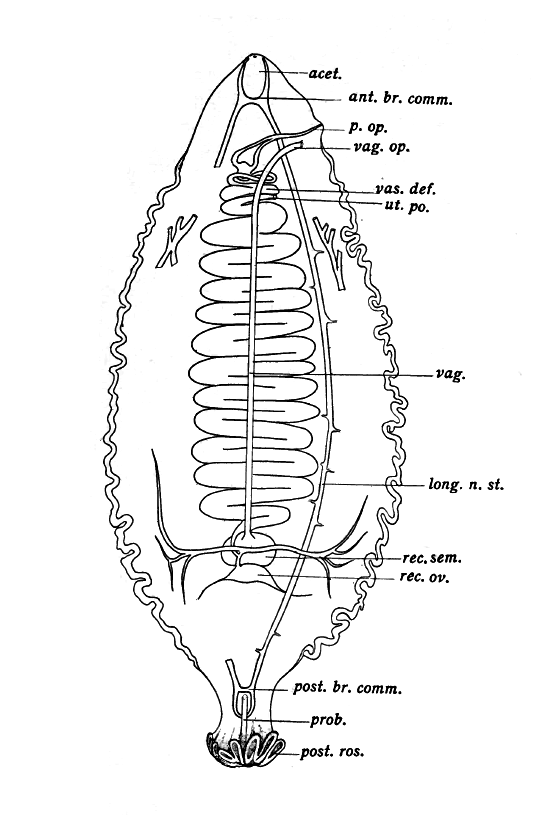
- Gyrocotyle rugosa

Scientific classification
- Kingdom: Animalia
- Phylum: Platyhelminthes
- Class: Cestoda
- Subclass: Cestodaria
- Order: Gyrocotylidea; Poche, 1926

Subgroups
- See text.

= Gyrocotylidea =

Order of flatworms

Gyrocotylidea is an order of Cestoda (tapeworms). Members of this order are parasites of vertebrates, living in the coelom (the body cavity). Gyrocotylidea are a subspecies of the tapeworm that is mainly a parasite of fishes and turtles. They do not have a gut, thus being classified with Cestodes.
