= Conocyemidae =

Scientific classification
- Domain: Eukaryota
- Kingdom: Animalia
- Phylum: Dicyemida
- Class: Rhombozoa
- Family: Conocyemidae; Stunkard, 1937

Family of worms

Conocyemidae is a family of worms belonging to the class Rhombozoa, order unknown.

Genera:

- Conocyema Van Beneden, 1882
- Microcyema Van Beneden, 1882
