= Lecanicephaloidea =

Scientific classification
- Kingdom: Animalia
- Phylum: Platyhelminthes
- Class: Cestoda
- Subclass: Eucestoda
- Order: Lecanicephaloidea

Families
- Aberrapecidae Jensen, Caira, Cielocha, Littlewood & Waeschenbach, 2016; Cephalobothriidae Pintner, 1928; Eniochobothriidae Jensen, Caira, Cielocha, Littlewood & Waeschenbach, 2016; Lecanicephalidae Braun, 1900; Paraberrapecidae Jensen, Caira, Cielocha, Littlewood & Waeschenbach, 2016; Polypocephalidae Meggitt, 1924; Tetragonocephalidae Yamaguti, 1959; Zanobatocestidae Jensen, Caira, Cielocha, Littlewood & Waeschenbach, 2016; Plus Lecanicephalidea incertae sedis; see text

Order of flatworms

Lecanicephaloidea is an order of tapeworms of the subclass Cestoda. Species in the order consist of intestinal parasites of elasmobranch fishes.

== Anatomy ==
The order is distinguished in that the scolex consists of two parts. The lower half forms a neck bearing four small suckers. The upper half is either globular or tentacle-bearing, and shows glandular structures. The anatomy of the order is similar to that of the Proteocephaloidea.

== Taxonomy ==
The order currently contains the following families, according to WoRMS:

- Aberrapecidae Jensen, Caira, Cielocha, Littlewood & Waeschenbach, 2016
- Cephalobothriidae Pintner, 1928
- Eniochobothriidae Jensen, Caira, Cielocha, Littlewood & Waeschenbach, 2016
- Lecanicephalidae Braun, 1900
- Paraberrapecidae Jensen, Caira, Cielocha, Littlewood & Waeschenbach, 2016
- Polypocephalidae Meggitt, 1924
- Tetragonocephalidae Yamaguti, 1959
- Zanobatocestidae Jensen, Caira, Cielocha, Littlewood & Waeschenbach, 2016

Additionally, the order contains the following accepted incertae sedis genera:

- Corrugatocephalum Caira, Jensen & Yamane, 1997
- Healyum Jensen, 2001
- Quadcuspibothrium Jensen, 2001

The order additionally contains several genera that are considered to be taxa inquirenda:

- Calycobothrium Stiles & Hassall, 1912
- Kystocephalus Shipley & Hornell, 1906
- Sephenicephalum Shinde, Sarwade & Jadhav, 1980 or 1982
- Staurobothrium Shipley & Hornell, 1905
- Trygonicephalum Shinde & Jadhav, 1985
