= Diphyllidea =

Scientific classification
- Kingdom: Animalia
- Phylum: Platyhelminthes
- Class: Cestoda
- Subclass: Eucestoda
- Order: Diphyllidea

Families
- Echinobothriidae

Order of flatworms

Diphyllidea is a monotypic order of Cestoda (tapeworms). Members of this order are gut parasites of elasmobranch fishes including rays and sharks. Disphyllidea infect their host’s spiral intestine. Scolex is the type of tapeworm associated with Disphyllidea, which have a hook-like structure that helps attach to their host’s gut.
