= Kantharella =

Scientific classification
- Domain: Eukaryota
- Kingdom: Animalia
- Phylum: Dicyemida
- Class: Rhombozoa
- Family: Kantharellidae; Czaker, 1994
- Genus: Kantharella; Czaker, 1994

Genus of worms

Kantharellidae is a family of worms belonging to the class Rhombozoa, order unassigned. The family consists of only one genus: Kantharella Czaker, 1994. The only species in the genus is Kantharella antarctica. This species is most closely related to other species of the order Dicyemida, which only has one other family, Dicyemidae.

Kantharella is characterized by species that are parasitic endosymbiotes and live within renal sacs of species of cephalopods. They consist of only about 30 cells and they feed off of nutrients in the urine of cephalopods.

== Taxonomy ==
The genus contains only one species Kantharella antarctica and is the only member of the family Katharellidae. Katharellidae is one of three members of the order Dicyemids which also includes Dicyemidae and Conocyemidae.

== Structure and Behavior ==
Kantharella are bilaterally symmetrical with a vermiform body shape. They are carnivores that utilize their cephalopod hosts for nutrition. They exclusively live in the ocean and reproduce asexually.

== Evolution ==
The parasitic nature of Kantharella is a trait that evolved significantly long ago as all species within the class Rhomobozoa, also known as Dicyemida, are parasites. There is debate to which species are closest living relatives to Kantharella as there is molecular phylogenies supporting differing species. They have been found to share genetic similarities with roundworms as well as species in the phylum Orthonectida.
