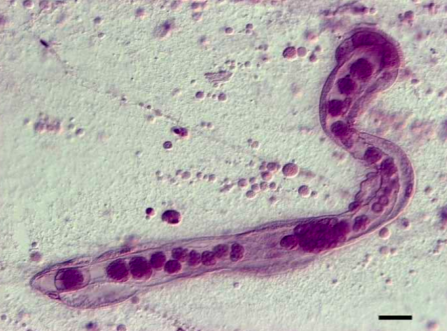
- Photomicrograph of Dicyema japonicum

Scientific classification
- Kingdom: Animalia
- Subkingdom: Eumetazoa
- Clade: ParaHoxozoa
- Clade: Bilateria
- Clade: Nephrozoa
- Clade: Protostomia
- Clade: Spiralia
- Clade: Platytrochozoa
- Phylum: Dicyemida

= Dicyemida =

Phylum of tiny parasites of cephalopods

Dicyemida, also known as Rhombozoa, is a phylum of tiny parasites that live in the renal appendages of cephalopods.

== Taxonomy ==
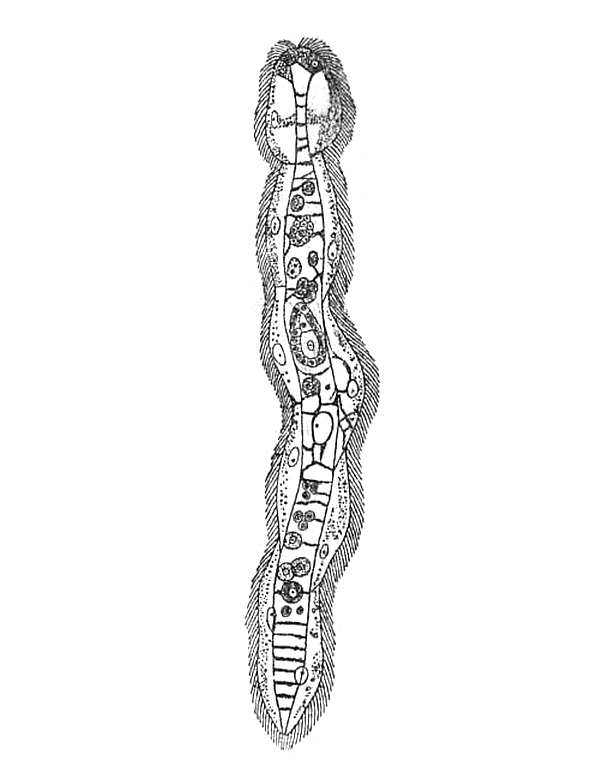
Dicyema macrocephalum

Classification is controversial. Traditionally, dicyemids have been grouped with the Orthonectida in the phylum Mesozoa and, from 2017, molecular evidence appears to confirm this.

However, other molecular phylogenies have placed the dicyemids more closely related to the roundworms. Additional molecular evidence suggests that this phylum is derived from the Lophotrochozoa.

The phylum (or class if retained within Mesozoa) contains three families, Conocyemidae, Dicyemidae and Kantharellidae, which have sometimes been further grouped into orders. Authors who treat Dicyemida as an order and separate the family Conocyemidae into a different order (Heterocyemida) prefer 'Rhombozoa' as a more inclusive and unambiguous name to cover all three families.

== Anatomy ==
Adult dicyemids range in length from 0.5 to 7 millimetres (0.020 to 0.276 in), and they can be easily viewed through a light microscope. They display eutely, a condition in which each adult individual of a given species has the same number of cells, making cell number a useful identifying character. Dicyemida lack respiratory, circulatory, excretory, digestive, and nervous systems.

The organism's structure is simple: a single axial cell is surrounded by a jacket of twenty to thirty ciliated cells. The anterior region of the organism is termed a calotte and functions to attach the parasite to folds on the surface of its host's renal appendages. When more than one species of dicyemida exist within the same host, they have distinctly shaped calottes, which range in shape from conical to disk shaped, or cap shaped.

To this day, there has never been a recorded case of two separate species of dicyemida existing in the same host and having exactly the same calotte. Species that share similar or even identical calottes have been found on occasion, but have never been found within the same host. Because of the constant variation in calotte size between species (even within one given host) there is very rarely observable competition between the multiple Dicyemida species for habitat or other resources. Calotte shape determines where a dicyemid can comfortably live. In general, dicyemida with conical shaped calottes fit best within the folds of the kidneys, while those with rounded calottes (disk or cap shaped) are more easily able to attach to the smooth surfaces of the kidneys. This extreme segregation of habitats allows multiple species of dicyemids to comfortably exist within the same host while not still competing for space or resources (by occupying different ecological niches).

== Habitat ==
While most dicyemid species have been found to prefer to live within specific cephalopods, no one species is unique in their preferences. In fact, It is also almost unheard of that a host infected with a dicyemid is only infected with one species. This means that if a select cephalopod is found to be infected with one dicyemid species, their body will likely be found to contain organisms with a variety of calotte shapes, which means they are infected with multiple different species. On the occasion that similar (but not identical) calotte shapes happen to be present within one host's body, one species usually ends up dominating the other, indicating that it has adapted more readily to the environment within the host. However, this occurrence is very rare and has only been observed a handful of times. In a study done on octopuses, it was found that Dicyemida that had similarly shaped calottes rarely coexisted in the same individual host, which suggested a strong level of competition for habitat.

In Japan, two types of dicyemid parasites, D. misakiense and D. japonicum, have often been discovered living in the same host. In 1938, when the two species were initially discovered, scientists did not classify them as separate species due to their large amount of morphological similarities. In fact, the only difference between the two species that scientists were able to observe was between the shape of their calottes.The idea that D. misakiense and D. japonicum are two different species is still very controversial among scientific groups. Some scientists have speculated that when closely related species of dicyemids coexist in the same region, such as in the case of D. misakiense and D. japonicum, competition for habitat causes them to evolve to develop two distinct calotte shapes.

== Life cycle ==
Dicyemids exist in both asexual and sexual forms. The former predominate in juvenile and immature hosts, and the latter in mature hosts. The asexual stage is termed a nematogen; it produces vermiform larvae within the axial cell. These mature through direct development to form more nematogens. Nematogens proliferate in young cephalopods, filling the kidneys.

As the infection ages, perhaps as the nematogens reach a certain density, vermiform larvae mature to form rhombogens, the sexual life stage, rather than more nematogens. This sort of density-responsive reproductive cycle is reminiscent of the asexual reproduction of sporocysts or rediae in larval trematode infections of snails. As with the trematode asexual stages, a few nematogens can usually be found in older hosts. Their function may be to increase the population of the parasite to keep up with the growth of the host.

Rhombogens contain hermaphroditic gonads developed within the axial cell. These gonads, more correctly termed infusorigens, self-fertilise to produce infusoriform larvae. These larvae possess a very distinctive morphology, swimming about with ciliated rings that resemble headlights. It has long been assumed that this sexually produced infusoriform, which is released when the host eliminates urine from the kidneys, is both the dispersal and the infectious stage. The mechanism of infection, however, remains unknown, as are the effects, if any, of dicyemids on their hosts.

Some part of the dicyemid life cycle may be tied to temperate benthic environments, where they occur in greatest abundance. While dicyemids have occasionally been found in the tropics, the infection rates are typically quite low, and many potential host species are not infected. Dicyemids have never been reported from truly oceanic cephalopods, who instead host a parasitic ciliate fauna. Most dicyemid species are recovered from only one or two host species. While not strictly host specific, most dicyemids are only found in a few closely related hosts.
