= Nippotaeniidea =

Scientific classification
- Kingdom: Animalia
- Phylum: Platyhelminthes
- Class: Cestoda
- Subclass: Eucestoda
- Order: Nippotaeniidea

Families
- Nippotaeniidae

Order of flatworms

Nippotaeniidea is a monotypic order of Cestoda (tapeworms). Members of this order are gut parasites of vertebrates.
