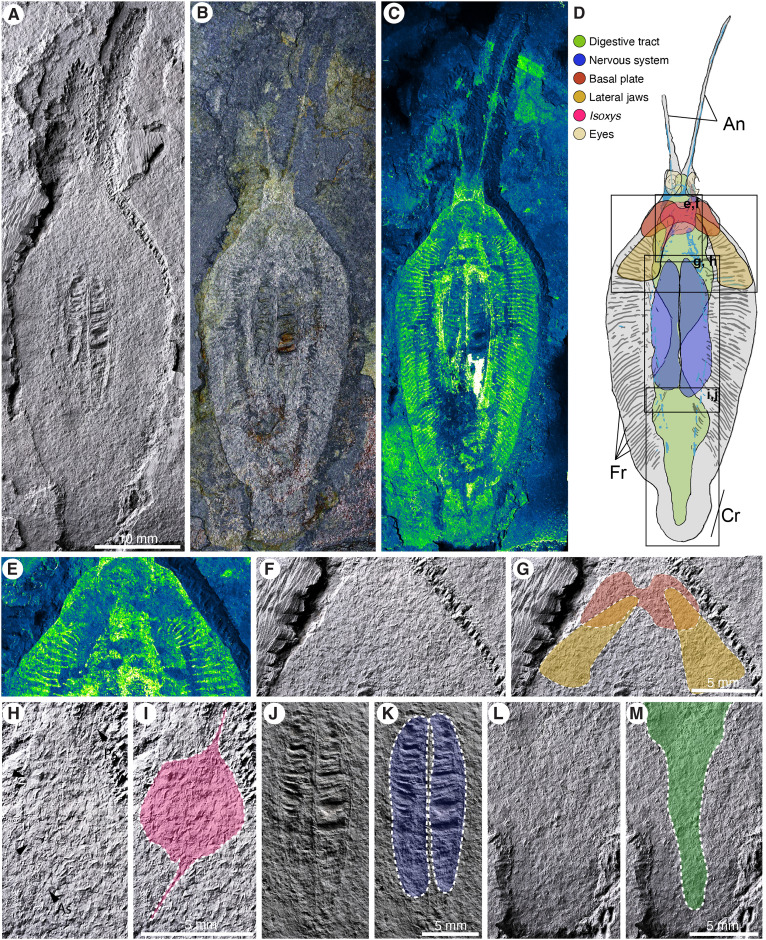
- MGUH34956, the holotype of N. evasmithae

Scientific classification
- Kingdom: Animalia
- Clade: Gnathifera
- Clade: Cucullophora
- Stem group: Chaetognatha
- Family: †Nectocarididae
- Genus: †Nektognathus; Vinther et al., 2025
- Species: †N. evasmithae

Binomial name
- †Nektognathus evasmithae Vinther et al., 2025

= Nektognathus =

Nektognathus Temporal range: Cambrian Stage 3 521–514.5 Ma

Extinct genus of nectocaridid

Nektognathus evasmithae (IPA: [ˈnɛːktoˌɡnatʰos ˈivɑˌsmɪθeɪ]) is an extinct species of nectocaridid that lived about 520 million years ago, in the Cambrian. Its fossils are known from the Sirius Passet Lagerstätte in Peary Land, Greenland, and it was first described in 2025. Nektognathus shares features with both the formerly enigmatic Nectocaris and with the stem-chaetognath Timorebestia, suggesting they are closely related.

== Description ==
Previous studies on other nectocaridids which recovered them as basally splitting molluscs, however, this theory has been the subject of heavy debate with most rejecting it. The new evidence presented by Nektognathus led Vinther et al., (2025) to reassess the taxonomic position of all nectocaridids and assess them and their — now understood to be — closest relatives' overall evolutionary context.

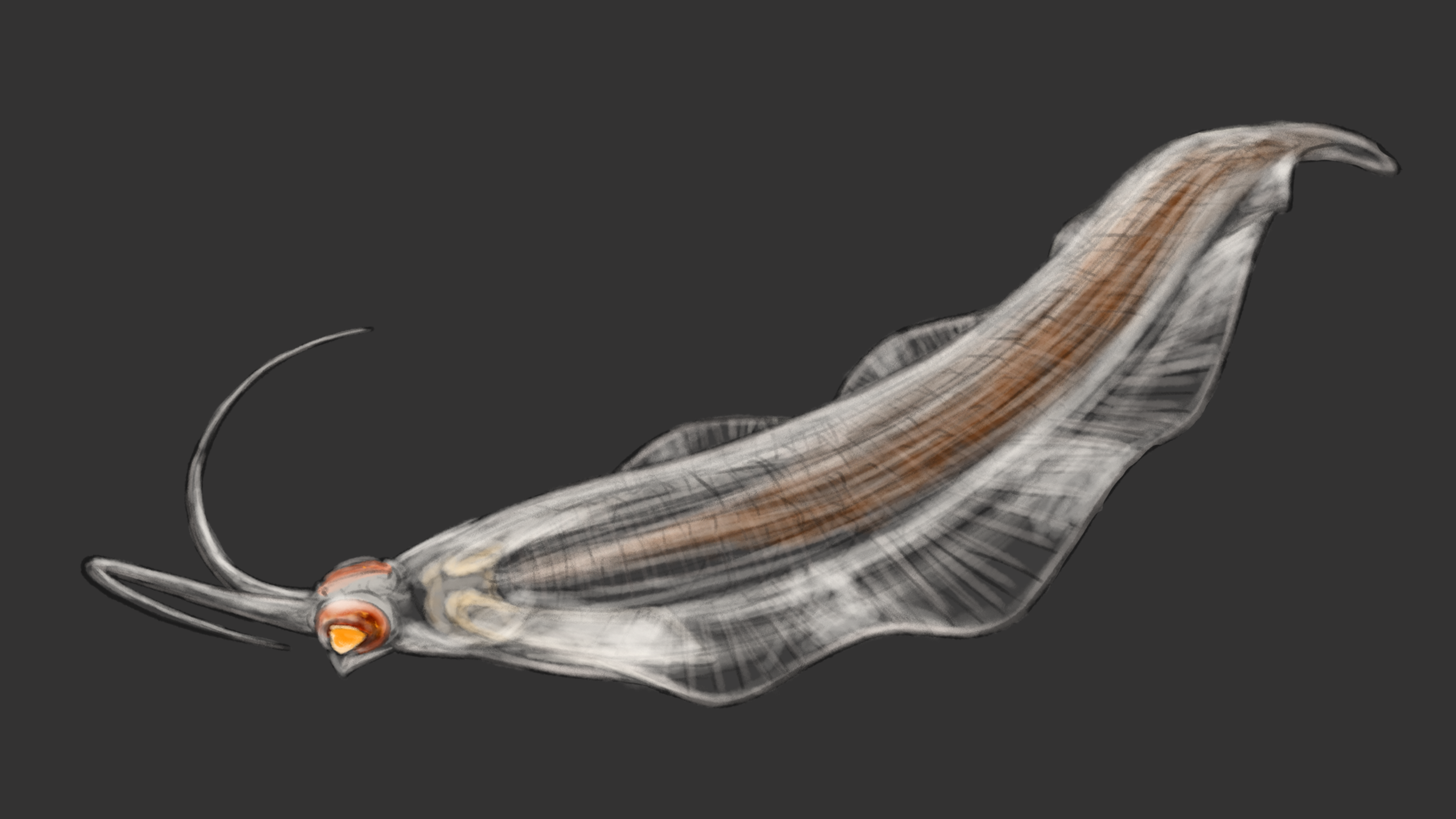
Life restoration of Nektognathus

The team erected the holotype MGUH34956 along with various referred specimens. It is an important discovery for the taxonomy of its family (Nectocarididae) as its anatomy is a mix of nectocaridid traits (eg. lateral camera-type eyes, tubular gut that terminates in front of the posterior fin region) and stem-group chaetognathan traits (eg. lightly sclerotized jaw elements, paired ventral ganglia).

=== Etymology ===
The generic name comes from the Ancient Greek prefix nekto- (derived from 'νηκτός' (IPA: [nɛːk.tós])) and the suffix -gnathus (derived from 'γνᾰ́θος' (IPA: [ɡná.tʰos])) creating the meaning 'swimming jaw'. The specific name, evasmithae (IPA: [ˈivɑˌsmɪθeɪ])), honours Professor Emeritus Eva Smith in recognition of her enduring fight for impartial justice for everyone and holding politicians accountable.

== Classification ==
The team found that the combination of Nektognathus' traits put nectocaridids in an evolutionary grade along with other stem-group chaetognathans like Timorebestia and Amiskwia. The team produced a majority (50%) rule consensus tree from a Bayesian analysis that has been reproduced below:

- Chaetognathifera Gnathifera sensu lato
  - Gnathifera sensu stricto
    - Gnathostomulida
      Gnathostomula paradoxa
    - - Micrognathozoa
        Limnognathia maerski
      - - †Inquicus fellatus
        - Rotifera
          - Adineta
          - Brachionus
  - Chaetognatha (total group)
    - - †Timorebestia
      - - †Nectocarididae
          - †Nectocaris pteryx
          - †Nektognathus
    - Cucullophora
      - †Amiskwia
      - - †"SP_new_chaetognath"^{[a]}
        - - †Ankalodous
          - †Capinatator
        - Chaetognatha (crown group)
          - Krohnitta
          - Eukrohnia
          - Protosagitta
          - Sagittidae
            - Flacisaggita
            - Sagitta
          - Spadellidae
            - Paraspadella
            - Spadella

^{a} A yet undescribed chaetognath, as of July 2025, from Sirius Passet

== Ecology ==
Nektognathus was an active nektonic predator of hard-shelled prey as evidenced by its camera-type eyes and the presence of various specimens (including the holotype) with the carapaces of Isoxys in various positions within their digestive tract. It would have used its antennae and eyes to gather information in the water column, and swam using its fin rays and caudal fin. It's most likely — through parsimony — that it had a mouth similar to Nectocaris, being a flaring tubular structure resembling a funnel, however, no specimens show this and the authors speculate that this may be due to preservation.
