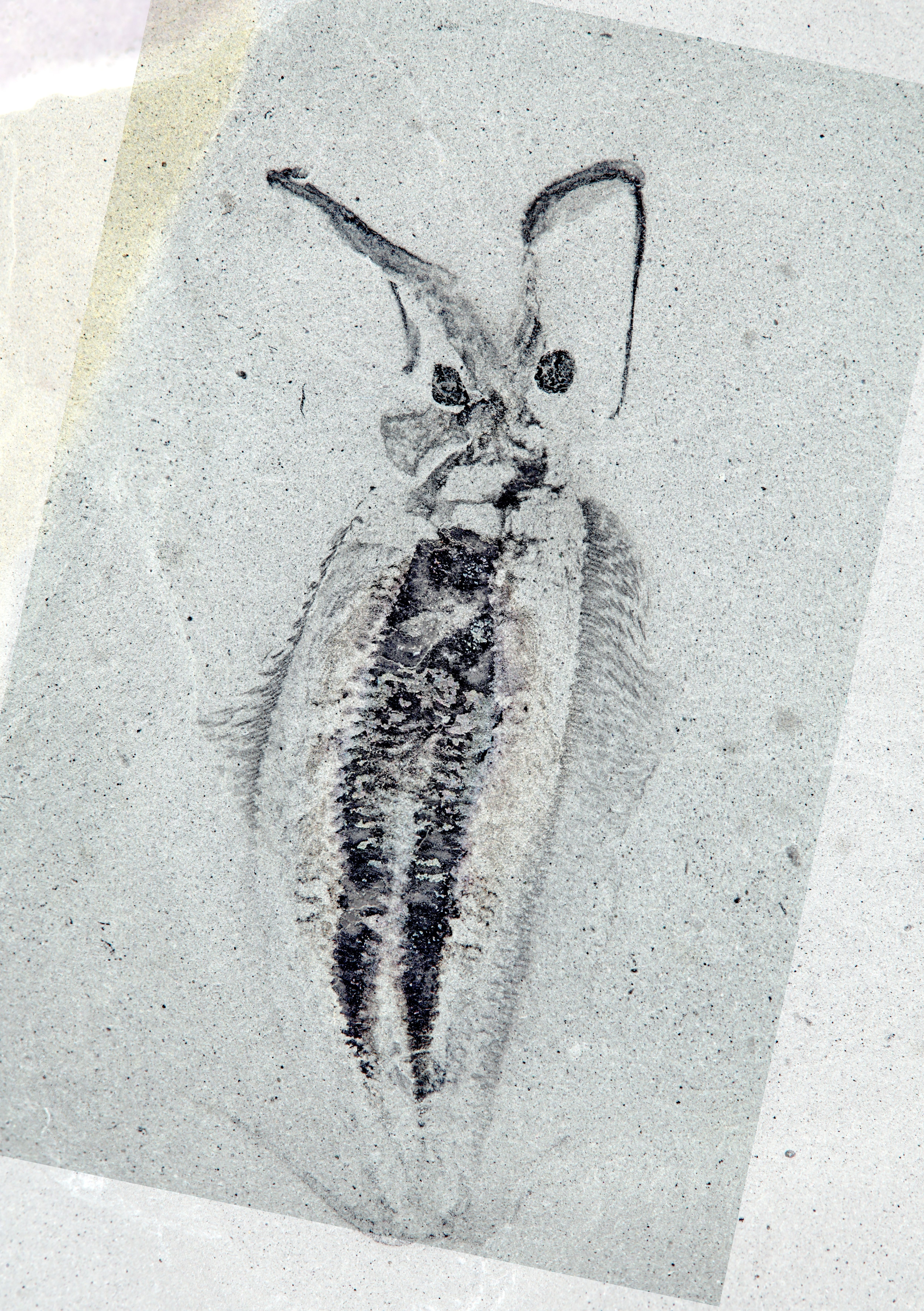
- Specimen ROM 60079

Scientific classification
- Kingdom: Animalia
- Stem group: Chaetognatha
- Family: †Nectocarididae
- Genus: †Nectocaris; Conway Morris, 1976

Type species
- Nectocaris pteryx Conway Morris, 1976

Other species
- N. latus? Luo and Hu, 1999

Synonyms
- Vetustovermis Glaessner, 1979; Petalilium Luo and Hu, 1999

= Nectocaris =

Nectocaris Temporal range: Cambrian Stage 3–Wuliuan

Extinct animal genus

Nectocaris is a genus of squid-like animal known from the Cambrian period. The initial fossils were described from the Burgess Shale of Canada. Other similar remains possibly referrable to the genus are known from the Emu Bay Shale of Australia and Chengjiang Biota of China.

Nectocaris was a free-swimming, predatory or scavenging organism. This lifestyle is reflected in its binomial name: Nectocaris means "swimming shrimp" (from the Ancient Greek νηκτόν, nekton, meaning "swimmer" and καρίς, karis, "shrimp"). Two morphs are known: a small morph, about an inch long, and a large morph, anatomically identical but around four times longer.

Nectocaridids had controversial affinities before 2025. Some authors have suggested that they represent the earliest known cephalopods. However, their morphology is strongly dissimilar to confirmed early cephalopods, and thus their affinities to cephalopods and even to molluscs more broadly are rejected by many authors. Their affinities to any animal group beyond Bilateria were long considered uncertain, until a 2025 study, which interpreted them as relatives of modern chaetognaths (arrow worms).

== Anatomy ==
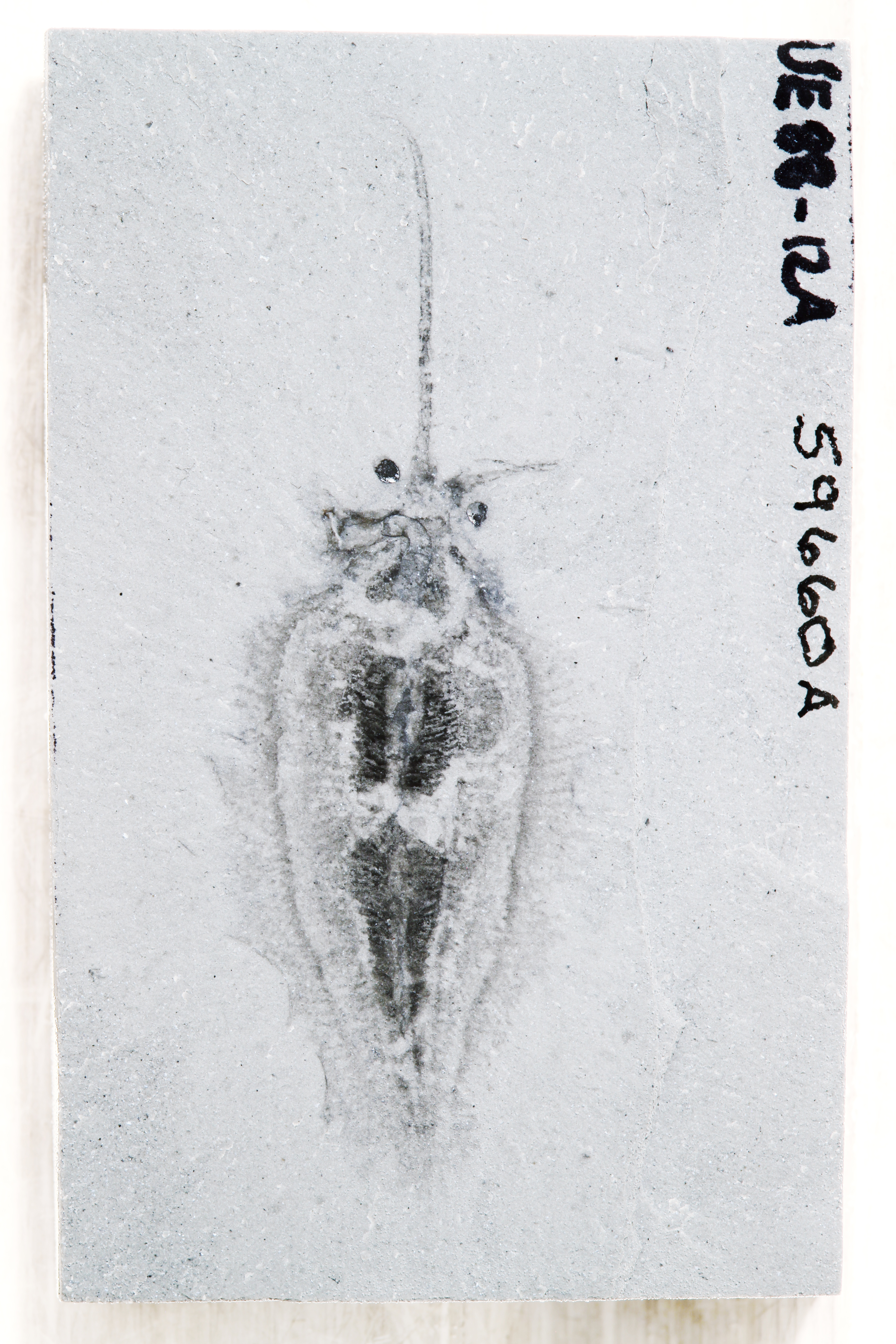
Nectocaris pteryx from the Burgess Shale; funnel is visible folded to left of specimen. Image from Smith (2013).

Specimens of Nectocaris pteryx reach a length of approximately 7.2 centimetres (2.8 in). Nectocaris had a flattened, spear head-shaped body with a fleshy-flat fin running along the length of each side. The small head had two large stalked eyes, a single pair of tentacles, and a flexible funnel-shaped structure opening out to the underside of the body. The funnel often gets wider away from the head. The funnel has been suggested to represent an eversible (able to be turned inside out) pharynx. Internally, a long cavity runs along the body axis, which is suggested to represent the digestive tract. The body contains a pair of gills; the gills comprise blades emerging from a zig-zag axis. Muscle blocks surrounded the axial cavity, and are now preserved as dark blocks in the lateral body. The fins also show dark blocks, with fine striations superimposed over them. These striations often stand in high relief above the rock surface itself. Within the mouth were jaw elements, including lightly sclerotized paired "lateral jaw elements" as well as a central "basal plate".

== Diversity ==
Although Nectocaris is known from Canada, China and Australia, in rocks spanning some 20 million years, there does not seem to be much diversity; size excepted, all specimens are anatomically very similar. Historically, three genera have been erected for nectocaridid taxa from different localities, but these 'species' – Petalilium latus and Vetustovermis planus – likely belong to the same genus or even the same species as N. pteryx. Within N. pteryx, there seem to be two discrete morphs, one large (~10 cm in length), one small (~3 cm long). These perhaps represent separate male and female forms.

== Ecology ==
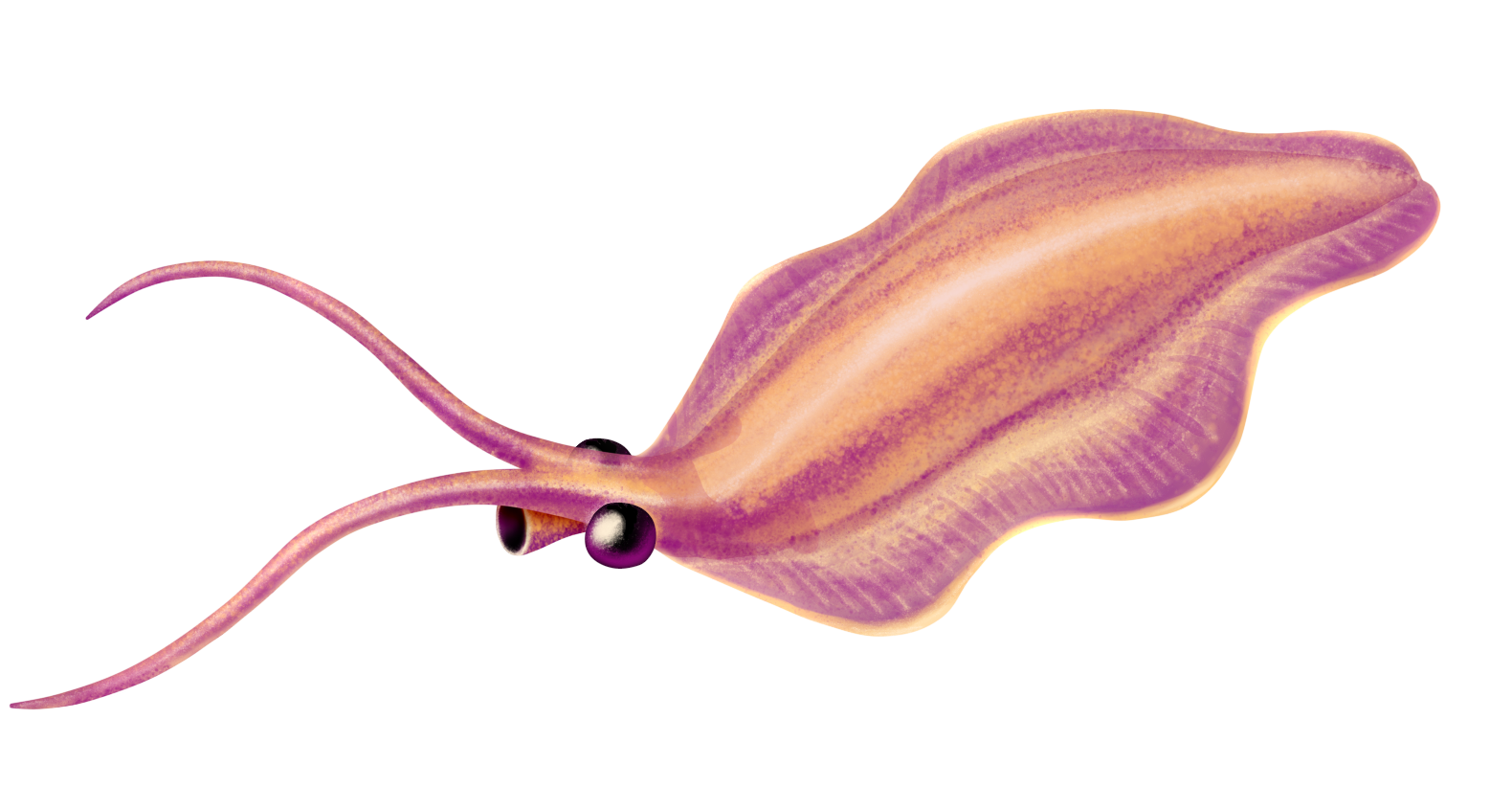
Life restoration

The unusual shape of the nectocaridid funnel has led to its interpretation as an eversible proboscis. Martin R. Smith and Jean-Bernard Caron have suggested that it was used for jet propulsion, though this has been questioned by other authors. The eyes of Nectocaris would have had a similar visual acuity to modern Nautilus (if they lacked a lens) or squid (if they did not). They are thought to have been freely-swimming nektonic organisms, that were either scavengers or predators on soft-bodied animals, using their tentacles to manipulate food items.

== Affinity ==
The affinity of Nectocaris is controversial. Martin R. Smith and Jean-Bernard Caron have suggested that nectocaridids represent early cephalopods. In a 2010 publication in Nature, they suggested that the ancestor of modern cephalopods and nectocaridids probably lacked a mineralised shell, while Smith in a later 2013 publication suggested that it may be more plausible that nectocaridids had instead lost a mineralised shell and developed a morphology convergent on modern coleoids, and in 2020 Smith described resembling taxon Nectocotis from Ordovician, which is suggested to have had an internal skeletal element. However, other authors contend that the morphology of nectocaridids is contrary to what is known about cephalopod and mollusc evolution, and they cannot be accommodated within these groups, and can only be confidently placed as members of Bilateria. A 2025 study based on specimens of the related Nektognathus from Sirius Passet of Greenland which preserved neural tissue showed the presence of a ventral ganglion (part of the nervous system within the body cavity), a distinctive characteristic found only among arrow worms (chaetognaths) as well as other extinct Cambrian relatives like the large Amiskwia also known from the Burgess Shale, with the "lateral jaw elements" and "basal plate" found in nectocaridids likely homologous to the jaw elements of other chaetognathiferans, firmly placing nectocaridids in the chaetognath stem-group.

Cladogram after Vinther et al. 2025.

- Chaetognathifera
  - Gnathifera s.s.
    - Gnathostomulida
    - - Micrognathozoa
      - Rotifera
  - - - †Timorebestia
      - †Nectocarididae
    - - †Amiskwia
      - Chaetognatha (arrow worms)

== History of study ==
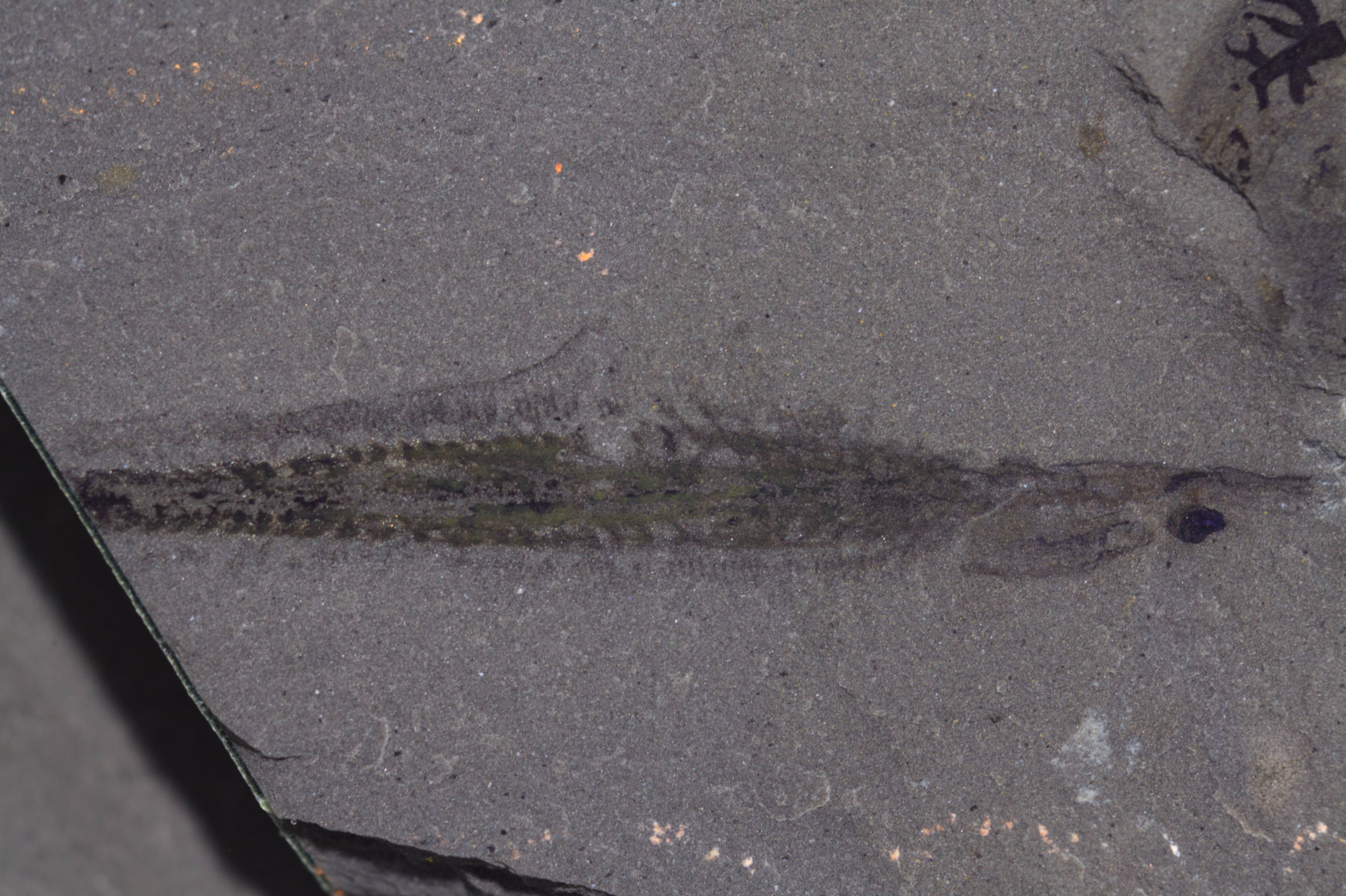
Holotype of Nectocaris, an incomplete specimen that gave rise to erroneous reconstructions

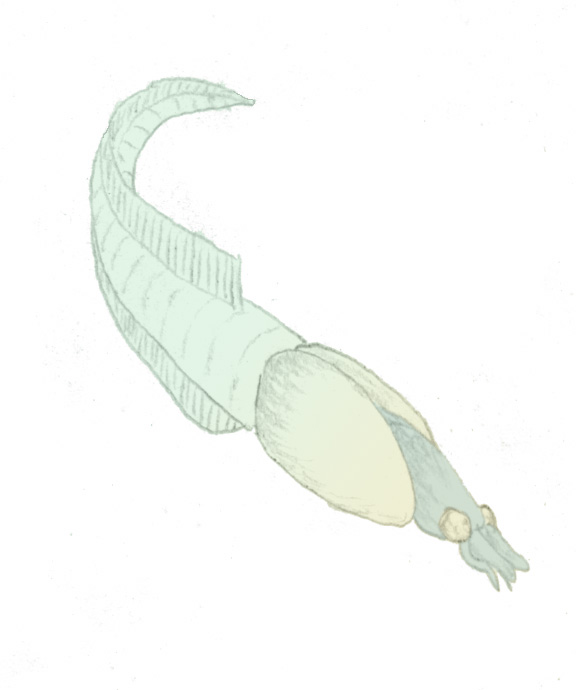
Original (and obsolete) reconstruction based on a single, incompletely preserved, lateral specimen (left). The author of this reconstruction, based on the material then available, considered Nectocaris to bear arthropod and chordate-like features

Nectocaris has a long and convoluted history of study. Charles Doolittle Walcott, the discoverer of the Burgess Shale, had photographed the one specimen he had collected in the 1910s, but never had time to investigate it further. As such, it was not until 1976 that Nectocaris was formally described, by Simon Conway Morris.

Because the genus was originally known from a single, incomplete specimen and with no counterpart, Conway Morris was unable to deduce its affinity. It had some features which were reminiscent of arthropods, but these could well have been convergently derived. Its fins were very unlike those of arthropods.

Working from photographs, the Italian palaeontologist Alberto Simonetta believed he could classify Nectocaris within the chordates. He focused mainly on the tail and fin morphology, interpreting Conway Morris's 'gut' as a notochord – a distinctive chordate feature.

The classification of Nectocaris was revisited in 2010, when Martin Smith and Jean-Bernard Caron described 91 additional specimens, many of them better preserved than the type. These allowed them to reinterpret Nectocaris as a primitive cephalopod, with only 2 tentacles instead of the 8 or 10 limbs of modern cephalopods. The structure previous researchers had identified as an oval carapace or shield behind the eyes was suggested to be a soft funnel, similar to the ones used for propulsion by modern cephalopods. The interpretation would push back the origin of cephalopods by at least 30 million years, much closer to the first appearance of complex animals, in the Cambrian explosion, and implied that – against the widespread expectation – cephalopods evolved from non-mineralized ancestors.

Later independent analyses questioned the cephalopod interpretation, stating that it did not square with the established theory of cephalopod evolution, and that nectocaridids should be considered incertae sedis among Bilateria. A later 2025 study found that nectocaridids were chaetognathiferans, and likely early diverging relatives of chaetognaths (arrow worms).

=== Vetustovermis ===
Vetustovermis (from Latin: "very old worm") is a soft-bodied middle Cambrian animal, known from a single reported fossil specimen from the South Australian Emu Bay Shale. It is probably a junior synonym of Nectocaris pteryx.

The original description of Vetustovermis hedged its bets regarding classification, but tentatively highlighted some similarities with the annelid worms. It was later considered an arthropod, and in 2010 Smith and Caron, agreeing that Petalilium was at least a close relative of Vetustovermis (but that treating it as a synonym was premature, given the poor preservation of the Vetustovermis type), placed it with Nectocaris in the clade Nectocarididae.

Early press reports misspelled the genus name as Vetustodermis.

=== Petalilium ===
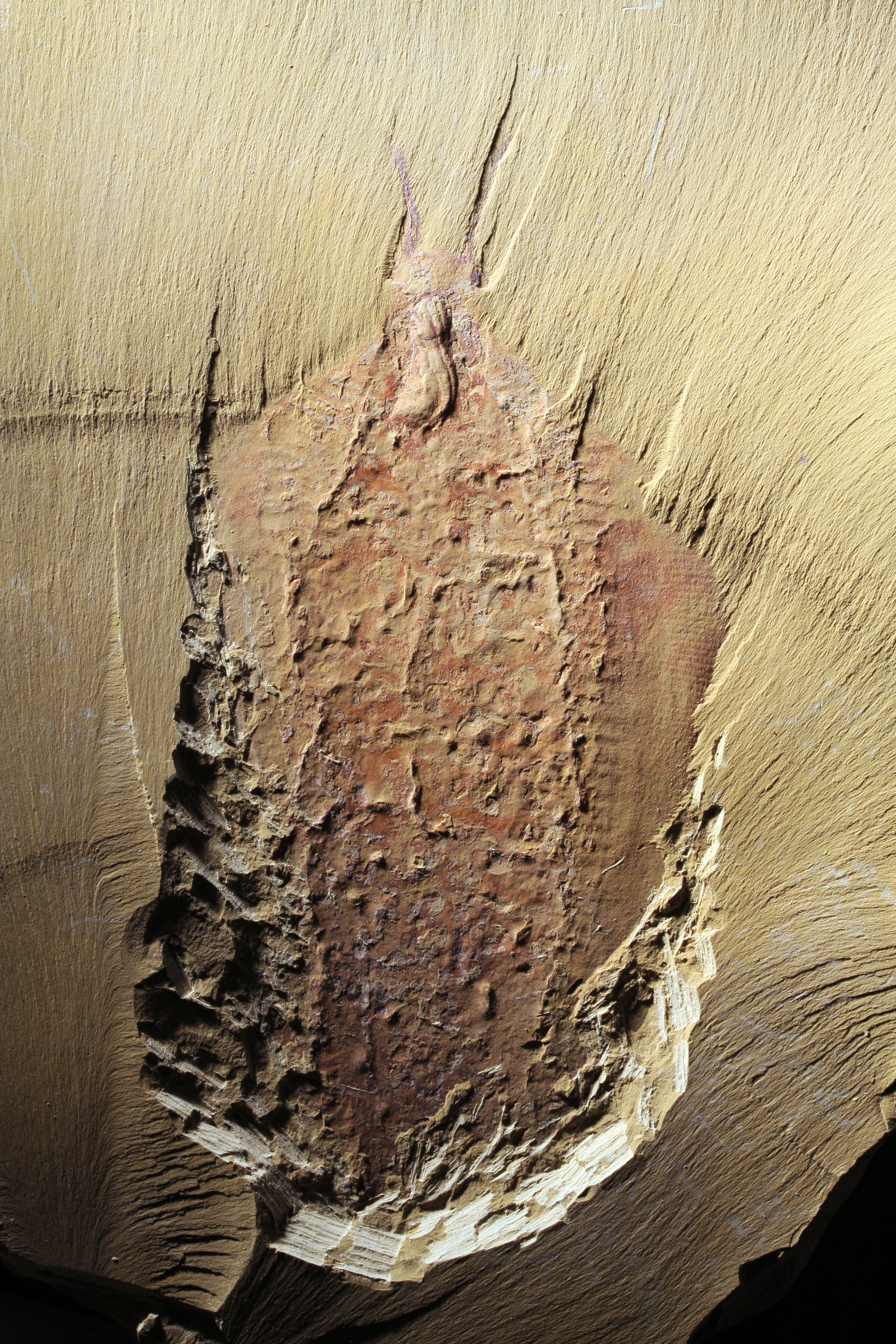
Fossil of Petalilium

Petalilium (sometimes misspelled Petalium) is an enigmatic genus of Cambrian organism known from the Haikou area, from the Maotianshan mudstone member of the Chengjiang biota. The taxon has been considered a junior synonym of Nectocaris pteryx, although a 2025 study considers it a separate species, N. latus, within the same genus.

Fossils of Petalilium (Note: Petalilium was originally described as Vetustovermis by Chen et al. (2005), but recognised as Petalilium by Smith & Caron (2010).) show a dorsoventrally flattened body, usually 5 to 6 centimetres, but ranging from 1.5 to 10 cm. It has an ovate trunk region and a large muscular foot, and a head with stalked eyes and a pair of long tentacles. The trunk region possesses about 50 soft, flexible, transverse bars, lateral serialised structures of unknown function. The upper part of the body, interpreted as a mantle, is covered with a random array of spines on the back, while gills project underneath. A complete, tubular gut runs the length of the body.

Whilst it was originally described as a phyllocarid, and a ctenophore affinity has been suggested, neither interpretation is supported by any compelling evidence.

Some of the characters observed in Chen et al.'s (2005) study suggested that Petalilium may be related to Nectocaris.

The 2025 study supported the synonymy of Nectocaris and Petalilium, but it was considered that this was a separate species (N. latus) rather than N. pteryx.

== See also ==
- Cambrian explosion
- Paleobiota of the Burgess Shale
- Chengjiang biota
  - List of Chengjiang Biota species by phylum
