= Siriocaris =

Siriocaris Temporal range: Cambrian Stage 3

Scientific classification
- Kingdom: Animalia
- Phylum: Arthropoda
- (unranked): †Artiopoda (?)
- Genus: †Siriocaris; Lagebro et al, 2009
- Species: †S. trollae

Binomial name
- †Siriocaris trollae Lagebro et al, 2009

Genus of Cambrian arthropod

Siriocaris is a genus of extinct arthropod from the Sirius Passet of Greenland. It contains one species, Siriocaris trollae. It has been assigned to Lamellipedia, although it was also compared to Emeraldella, another Cambrian arthropod, and was suggested to be an artiopod.

== Description ==
Siriocaris is roughly 11 cm (4.3 in) long at largest, with a sub-elliptical shape to its body. The head shield is parabolic in shape, weakly trilobate, and roughly a fifth of the body length. The head carries three pairs of biramous limbs, alongside a many-segmented pair of uniramous antennae at least two-thirds as long as the entire body. No eyes, mouth or hypostome are known. The biramous limbs are all equivalent in structure, with large proximal segments on the endopods and more hook-like distal segments. The basipod has two rows of spines along the middle, with a leaf-shaped exopod of similar length to the endopod. The trunk consists of around 20 segments, with the widest being the third and fourth tergite and measurements decreasing thereafter, with around half of the tergite width occupied by the axis. The pleurae are divided into an inner portion and an outer portion, the latter containing a spine. These spines are falcate in shape for the first seven tergites, before transitioning to sickle-shaped further down the body. The longest pleural spine is on the seventeenth tergite, with the last few decreasing in size. The anterior margin of the tergites forms a flange stacked under the posterior edge of the previous, with the distal margin curving into the pleural spine. The telson is small and shield-shaped, with it being flanked by the pleural spines of the last few tergites.

== Etymology ==
Siriocaris derives from caris “shrimp”, a common suffix for prehistoric arthropods, and the Sirius Passet where it is found. The species name is stated as being assigned "for Trolla", without further explanations.
