= Sirius Passet =

Cambrian Lagerstätte in Greenland

- Stratigraphic range: Cambrian Series 2; ~523–518 Ma
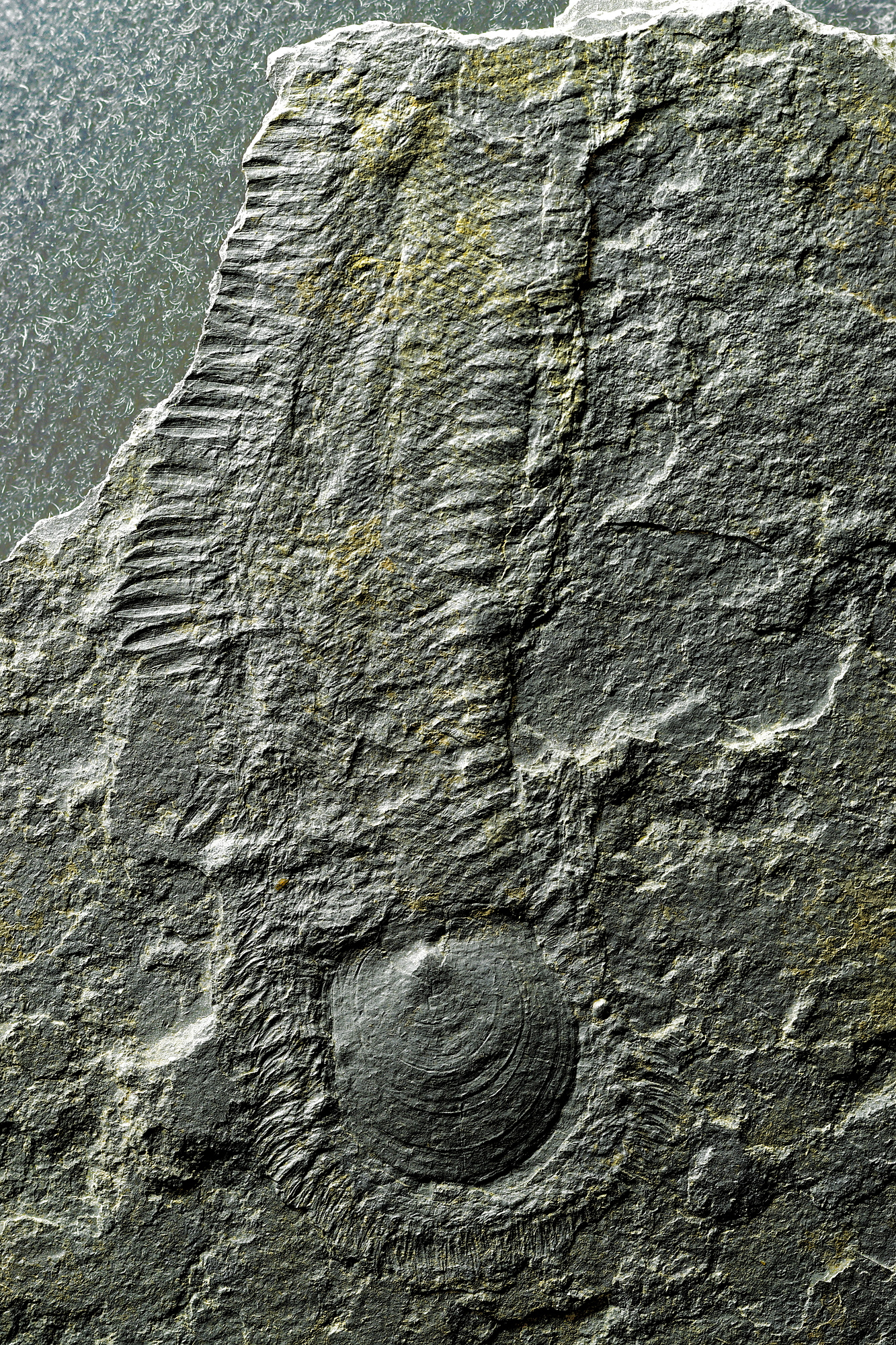
- Halkieria evangelista, an iconic fossil of the Sirius Passet
- Type: Geological formation

Lithology
- Primary: Mudstone

Location
- Coordinates: 82°47.6′N 42°13.7′W
- Region: Northern Greenland
- Country: Greenland

Type section
- Named for: Sirius sledge patrol
- Named by: A. Higgins
- Location: J.P. Koch Fjord
- Year defined: 1987
- Coordinates: 82°47.6′N 42°13.7′W
- Country: Greenland
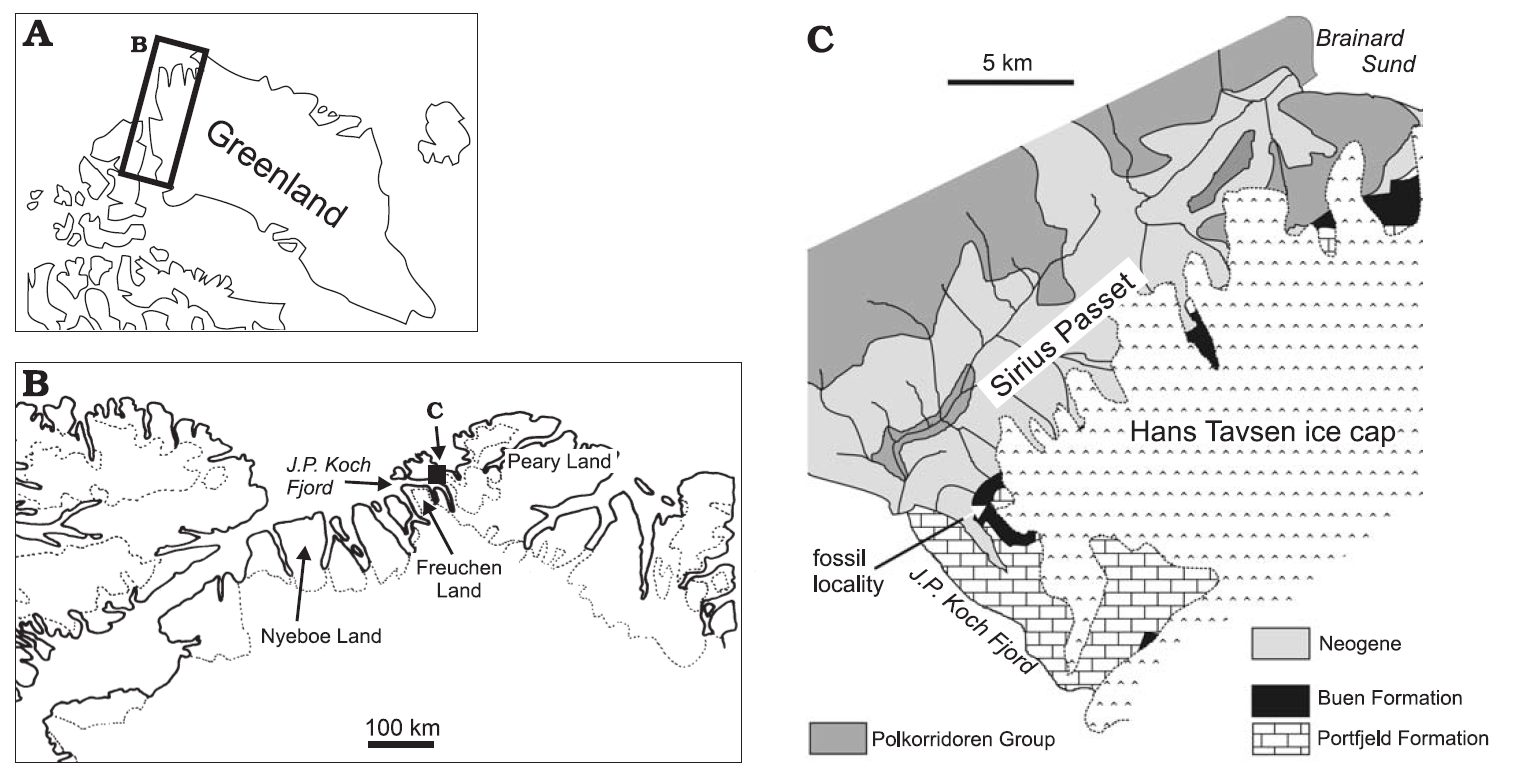
- Geologic Map with the Buen and the Portfjeld formations, and the Polkorridoren Group.

Sirius Passet is a Cambrian Lagerstätte in Peary Land, Greenland. The Sirius Passet Lagerstätte was named after the Sirius sledge patrol that operates in North Greenland. It comprises six places in Nansen Land, on the east shore of J.P. Koch Fjord in the far north of Greenland. It was discovered in 1984 by A. Higgins of the Geological Survey of Greenland. A preliminary account was published by Simon Conway Morris and others in 1987 and expeditions led by J. S. Peel and Conway Morris have returned to the site several times between 1989 and the present. A field collection of perhaps 10,000 fossil specimens has been amassed. It is a part of the Buen Formation.

== Age ==
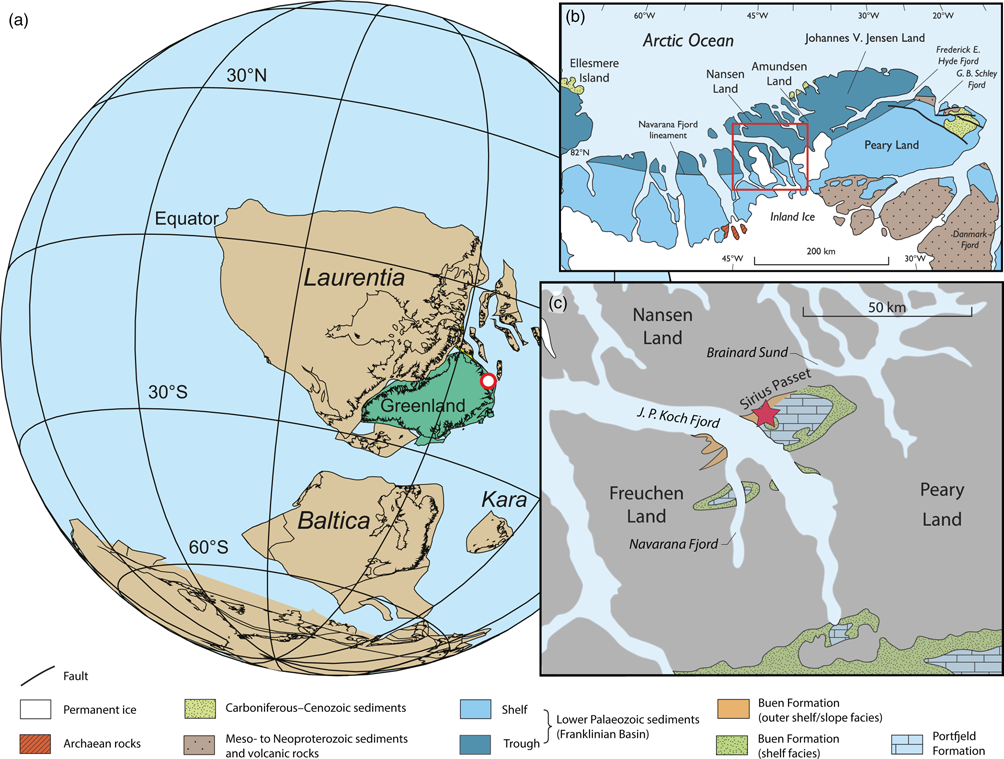
Location of Sirius Passet during the early Cambrian

The fauna is inevitably compared to that of the Burgess Shale, although it is probably ten to fifteen million years older – 518 million years ago vs. 505 million years ago) – and more closely contemporaneous with the fauna of the Maotianshan shales from Chengjiang, which are dated to 518 million years ago.

== Preservation ==
The preservation of the Sirius Passet is traditionally considered to represent silicification associated with a death mask, recalling the 'Ediacara-type' preservation of the Precambrian Ediacara biota. A 2022 study suggested that the original preservation mode was phosphatisation that was later altered by low-grade metamorphism with a peak temperature of 409 ± 50 °C (768 ± 90 °F) during the Devonian Ellesmerian orogeny, which resulted in widespread mineral replacement.

Geochemical analysis indicates that the fossils lived close to the boundary of an oxygen minimum zone, possibly being preserved in oxygen-starved periods.

== IUGS geological heritage site ==
In respect of the importance of the exceptionally preserved fossils in our understanding of the event, the 'Cambrian Explosion in Sirius Passet' was included by the International Union of Geological Sciences (IUGS) in its assemblage of 100 'geological heritage sites' around the world in a listing published in October 2022. The organisation defines an 'IUGS Geological Heritage Site' as 'a key place with geological elements and/or processes of international scientific relevance, used as a reference, and/or with a substantial contribution to the development of geological sciences through history.'

== Fauna ==
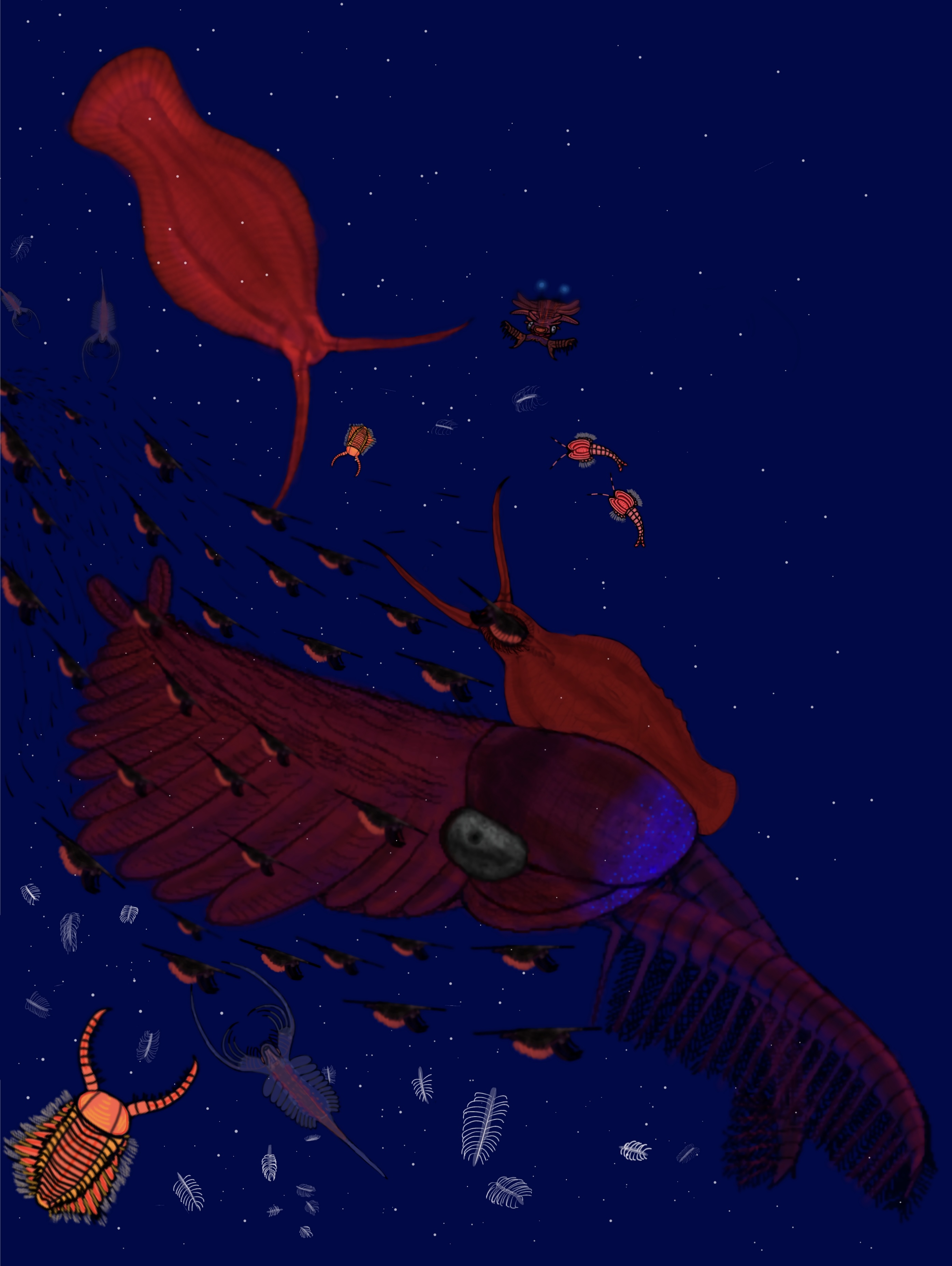
Restoration of Sirius passet, showing some examples of faunal species, including the filter feeding radiodont Tamisiocaris, and the stem arrow worm Timorebestia.

Although the fauna has not yet been fully described, it is known to consist of a moderate number of arthropods and sponges, and rare representatives of other groups. It has yielded the problematic taxon Halkieria, and the Panarthropods Kerygmachela and Pambdelurion, all of which have played prominent roles in discussions about the origins of the modern animal phyla.

=== Taxa from the Sirius Passet fauna ===
After

==== Arthropods ====
Arthropods
Genus	Species	Notes	Images
Aaveqaspis	A. inesoni	An arthropod of uncertain affinities	
Arthroaspis	A. bergstroemi	A member of Artiopoda	
Buenaspis	B. forteyi	A nektaspid artiopod	
Buenellus	B. higginsi	A trilobite	
Campanamuta	C. mantoni	An artiopod	
Kleptothule	K. rasmusseni	A trilobite	
Molaria	M. steini	An artiopod	
Sidneyia?	Indeterminate	A vicissicaudatan artiopod, later authors have stated that the assignment to the genus is equivocal.	Life restoration of Sidneyia inexpectans from the Burgess Shale to which the Sirius Passet form has been considered closely related
Thulaspis	T. tholops	A basal artiopodan closely related to Squamacula.	
Siriocaris	S. trollae	A possible member of Lamellipedia	
Isoxys	I. volucris, I. sp	An Isoxyid arthropod	
Kiisortoqia	K. soperi	A basal arthropod with large frontal appendages	
Kerygmachela	K. kierkegaardi	A "gilled lobopodian" closely related to arthropods	
Pambdelurion	P. whittingtoni	A "gilled lobopodian" closely related to arthropods	
Tamisiocaris	T. borealis	A filter feeding radiodont	
Amplectobeluidae	Indeterminate	Predatory radiodont	
Pauloterminus	P. spinodorsalis	A shrimp-like arthropod, possibly a member of Hymenocarina	

==== Other animals ====
Non-arthropod animals
Genus	Species	Notes	Images
Ooedigera	O. peeli	A vetulicolian, another indeterminate vetulicolian is also present	
Chordata	Indeterminate	Vertebrate-like chordate	
Hadranax	H. augustus	A lobopodian	
Halkieria	H. evangelista	A basal mollusc	
Xystoscolex	X. boreogyrus	A palaeoscolecid worm	
Avannaascolex	A. apalos	A palaeoscolecid worm unique for the lack of sclerites on its trunk	
Chalazoscolex	C. pharkus	A palaeoscolecid worm	
Timorebestia	T. koprii	A giant stem-group chaetognath	
Nektognathus	N. evasmithae	A small nectocaridid, related to chaetognatha	
Chaetognatha	Indeterminate	Small-sized form	
Pygocirrus	P. butyricampum	An annelid worm	
Phragmochaeta	P. canicularis	A polychaete worm	
Singuuriqia	S. simony	A priapulid worm	
Sirilorica	S. carlsbergi, S. pustulosa	a stem-group Loricifera or a scalidophoran	
Hyolithus	H. cf. tenuis	A hyolith	
Trapezovitus	Indeterminate	A hyolith	
Orthothecida	Indeterminate	A hyolith	
Hyolithida	Indeterminate	A hyolith	
Archaeocyatha	Indeterminate	A sponge	
Choia	C. cf. carteri	A sponge	
Constellatispongia	C. canismajorii	A sponge	
Crassicoactum	C. cucumis	A sponge	
Demospongiae	Indeterminate	A sponge	
Fieldospongia	F. bellineata	A sponge	
Hamptonia	H. limatula	A sponge	
Lenica	L. cf. unica L. hindei, L. perverse	A sponge	
Saetaspongia	S. cf. densa S. procera	A sponge	
Salactiniella	S. cf. plumata	A sponge	
Stephanella?	Indeterminate	A sponge	

== See also ==
- Matground
