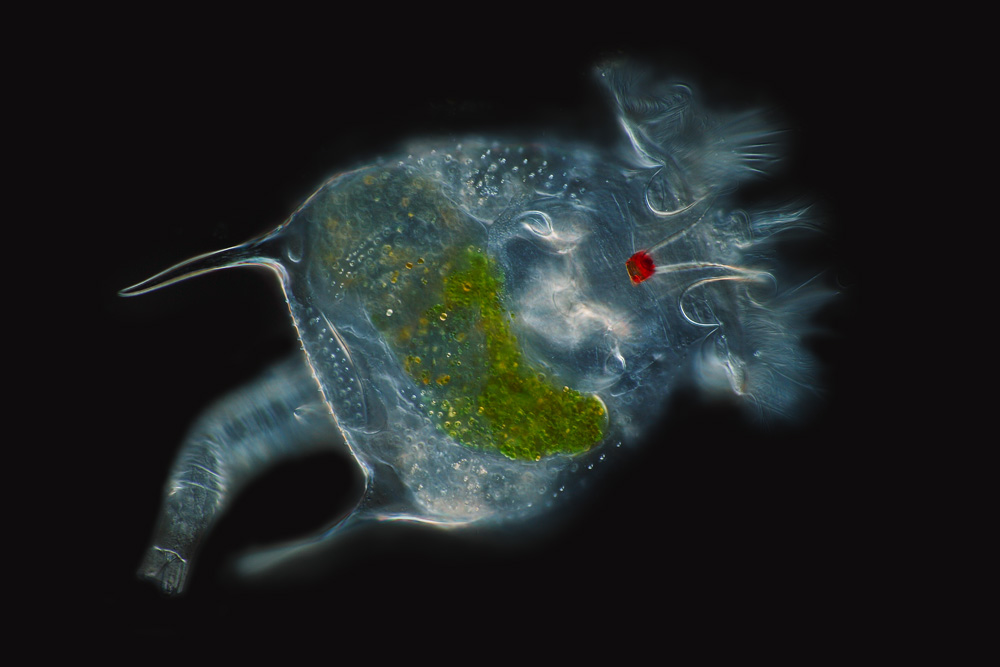
- Brachionus quadridentatus (Rotifera)
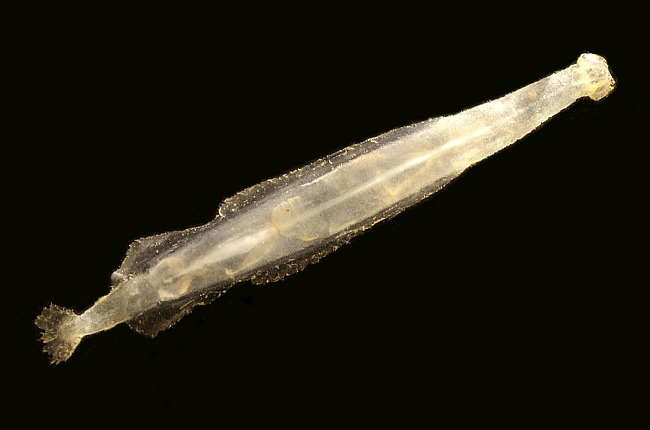
- Pseudosagitta maxima (Chaetognatha)

Scientific classification
- Kingdom: Animalia
- Subkingdom: Eumetazoa
- Clade: ParaHoxozoa
- Clade: Bilateria
- Clade: Nephrozoa
- Clade: Protostomia
- Clade: Spiralia
- Clade: Gnathifera; Ahlrichs, 1995

Phyla
- Gnathostomulida; Micrognathozoa; Rotifera; Pararotatoria; Seisonidae; Acanthocephala(?); †Juracanthocephalus; Acanthocephala; Eurotatoria; †Inquicus; †Fimbulispina; †Dakorhachis?; Total group Chaetognatha (likely a sister-clade to Gnathifera); †Nectocarididae; †Timorebestia; Cucullophora; †Amiskwia; Chaetognatha

Synonyms
- Chaetognathifera? Bekkouche & Gąsiorowski, 2022 (chaetognaths are sometimes found to nest within Gnathifera)

= Gnathifera =

Gnathifera Temporal range: Fortunian – Recent

Taxonomic clade

Gnathifera (from the Greek gnáthos, "jaw", and the Latin -fera, "bearing") is a clade of generally small spiralians characterized by complex jaws made of chitin. It comprises the phyla Gnathostomulida, Rotifera and Micrognathozoa. Chaetognatha has recently been recognised as closely related to the group, with it either being included within Gnathifera or the broader group Chaetognathifera.

Chaetognathiferans include some of the most abundant phyla. Rotifers are among the most diverse and abundant freshwater animals and chaetognaths are among the most abundant marine plankton.

== Description ==
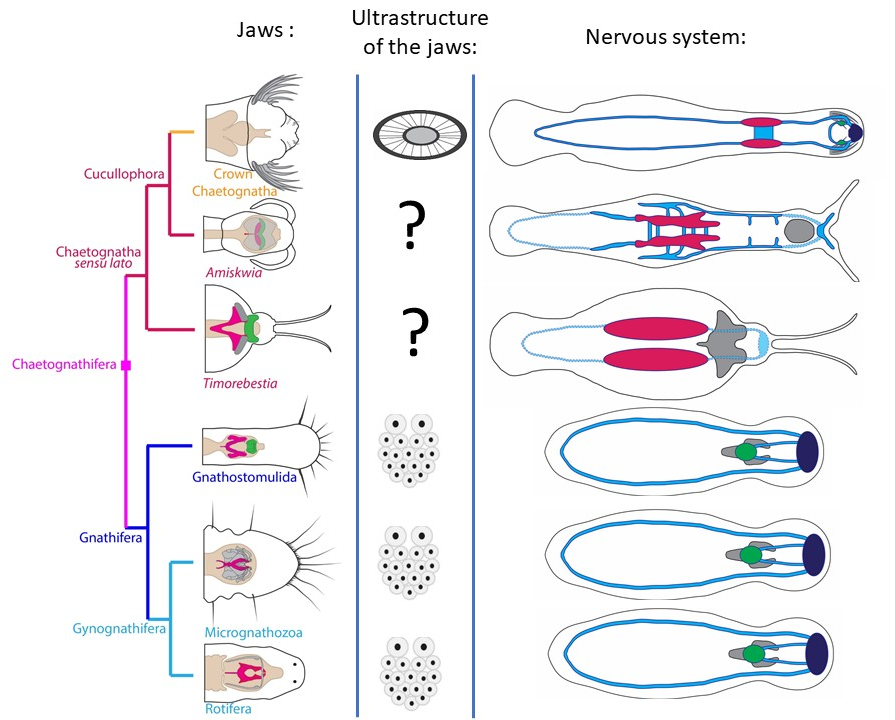
Hypothesis of the possible homology between the jaw parts and nervous system parts of extant and extinct Chaetognathifera taxa. Putative homologies between jaw parts and nervous system respectively have the same color. Questionable, and/or, disputable homologies are in grey. Non observed parts of the nervous system are in dotted lines. Only the anterior part of each organism is represented for the jaws. Modified from Bekkouche and Gąsiorowski 2022

In most gnathiferans, the anus opens on the dorsal surface of the animal. In micrognathozoans and gnathostomulids, the anus is transient and only forms during defecation. Unlike other chaetognathiferans, in chaetognaths and the extinct Amiskwia the anus is located on the ventral surface in a subterminal position.

Both Gnathostomulida and Micrognathozoa are acoelomates, rotifers are pseudocoelomates, and chaetognathans have a true coelom. Gnathostomulidans and chaetognathans are hermaphrodites, and Micrognathozoa appears to be parthenogenetic as no males have ever been observed, but it has been suggested undiscovered dwarf males could be responsible for fertilization. In rotifers both males and females occurs, except from the class Bdelloidea.

Extinct members of the total group of Chaetognatha, such as Timorebestia and Amiskwia known from the Cambrian are larger than living chaetognaths, and retain jaw-like mouthparts which are not found in living chaetognaths as well as lacking the spines present around the mouth of crown-group chaetognaths. They share with chaetognaths the fins running along the sides of the body and at the end of the tail, and the possession of a unique structure called the "ventral ganglion" not found among other animals which controls the movement and senses. These giant stem-chaetognaths are thought to have been free-swimming (nektonic) and occupied a higher trophic position than modern chaetognaths.

=== Development ===
All known chaetognathiferans are direct developers, except for some rotifers with intermediate stages, which appears to have evolved secondarily. Though chaetognathiferans are included in Spiralia, rotifers and chaetognaths do not exhibit spiral cleavage. Little is known of the development of micrognathozoans. The development of gnathostomulids is poorly known, but they appear to exhibit spiral cleavage.

== Classification ==
Chaetognathifera is a member of Spiralia. It is the sister taxon of a clade comprising all other spiralians. An alternative phylogeny place Gnathifera into a main spiralian clade Platyzoa s.l. as sister clade to Mesozoa and Platyhelminthes. Before the cladistic era, most gnathiferans were regarded as aschelminths, a grouping now recognized as polyphyletic.

Chaetognaths exhibit numerous morphological similarities to rotifers, suggesting that they may be sister taxa. However, molecular data recovers micrognathozoans as more closely related to rotifers than chaetognaths, supported by several analyses recovering Chaetognatha as the sister-clade to all other gnathiferans.

Rotifera comprises four subclades: Seisonida, Acanthocephala, Bdelloidea, and Monogononta. Acanthocephalans were traditionally excluded from Rotifera, but it is now known that rotifers are paraphyletic without including acanthocephalans. Some taxonomists call the clade of rotifers including acanthocephalans Syndermata, but others continue to use Rotifera and regard acanthocephalans as rotifers. Numerous hypotheses of rotifer interrelationships exist.

- Spiralia
  - Chaetognathifera
    - Chaetognatha
    - Gnathifera
      - Gnathostomulida
      - - Micrognathozoa
        - Rotifera
          - Seisonida
          - Acanthocephala
          - Bdelloidea
          - Monogononta
  - Platytrochozoa

Summary of relationships of gnathiferans in recent studies, with disputed relationships represented as polytomies

The enigmatic phylum Cycliophora may belong to Gnathifera, but other studies suggest that it is more closely related to the Entoprocta.

In 2022, the clade Cucullophora was proposed to include Amiskwia and crown-group chaetognaths, citing the shared presence of a head hood and body fins, the same study proposed the clade Gynognathifera to include Rotifera and Micrognathozoa.

== Fossil record ==
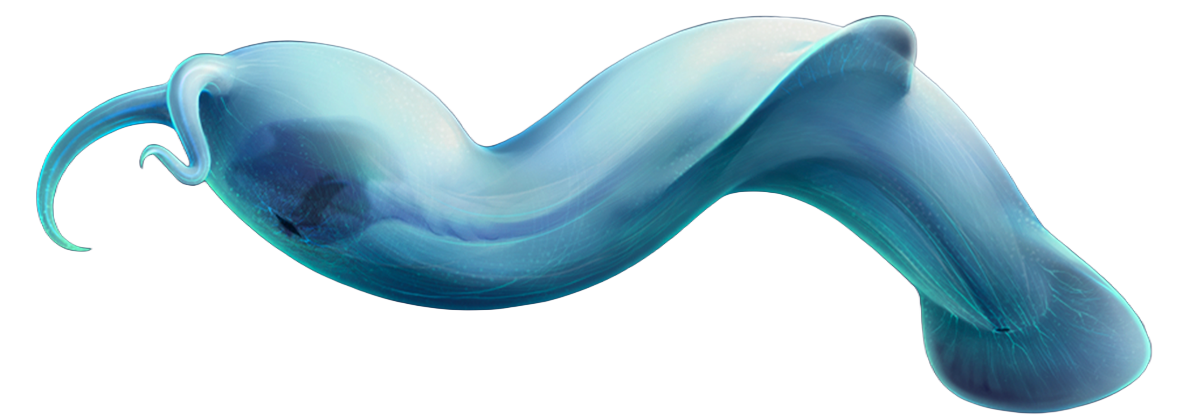
Amiskwia sagittiformis a basal gnathiferan from Cambrian of Canada, which is much larger than modern gnathiferans

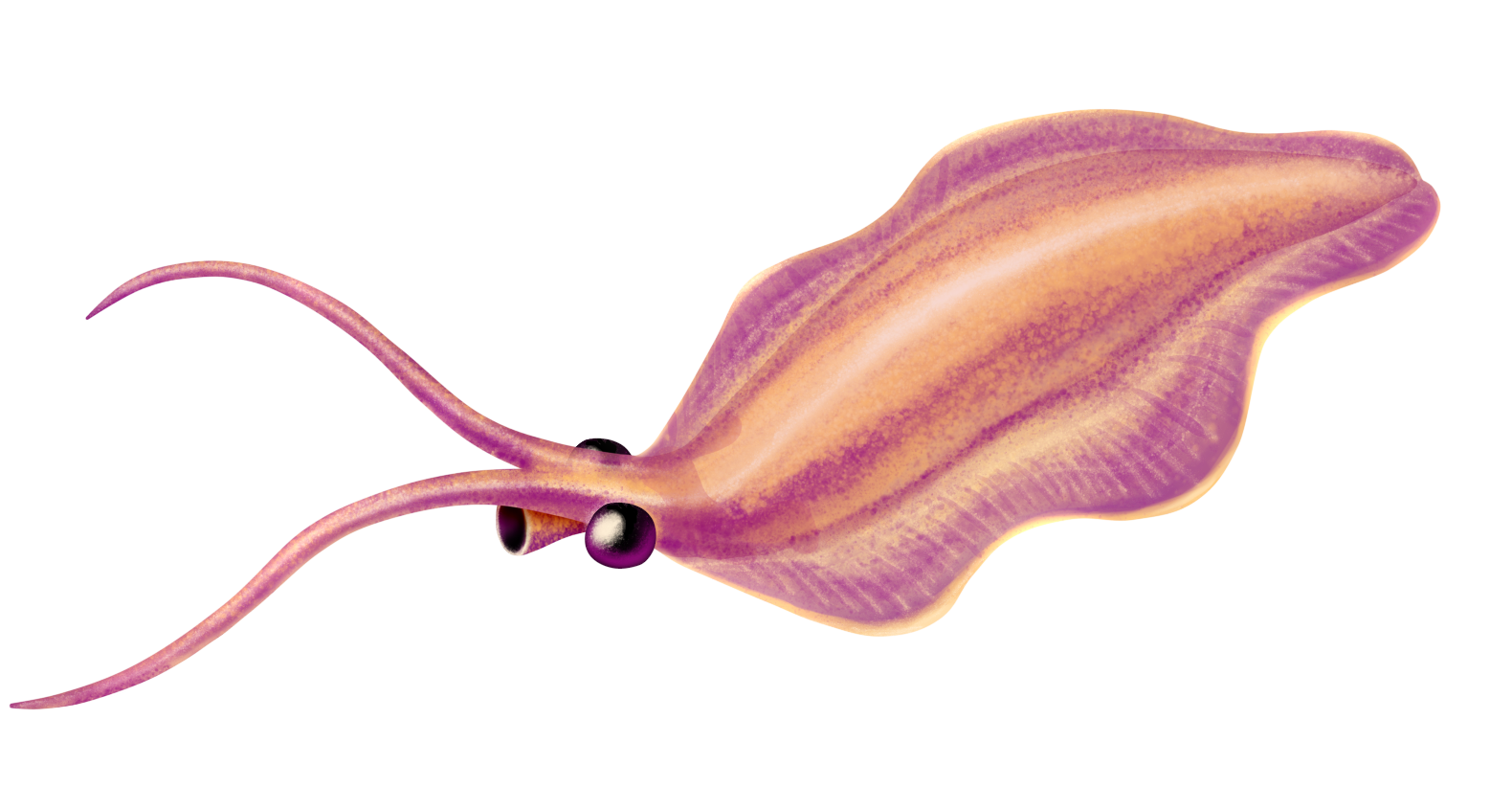
Life restoration of Nectocaris, a squid-like Cambrian chaetognathiferan related to chateognaths

The fossil record of chaetognathiferans is poor. There are no known fossil gnathostomulids. Fossils of the extant rotifer genus Habrotrocha are known from Dominican amber dating to the late Eocene, but rotifers are otherwise only known from the Holocene. By contrast, the chaetognath fossil record, while still patchy, includes numerous Paleozoic specimens. Protoconodonts are stem-group chaetognaths. The earliest protoconodonts date to the Fortunian age of the Cambrian, and are among the oldest known bilaterians. The enigmatic Cambrian taxa Amiskwia and Nectocarididae, along with the newly described Timorebestia, have been recently recognised as chaetognathiferans and suggested to be stem-group chaetognaths. The Cambrian ectoparasite Inquicus appears to be a gnathiferan.

Cladogram after Vinther et al. 2025:

- Chaetognathifera
  - Gnathifera s.s.
    - Gnathostomulida
    - - Micrognathozoa
      - Rotifera
  - - - †Timorebestia
      - †Nectocarididae
    - - †Amiskwia
      - Chaetognatha (arrow worms)

== History ==
Gnathifera was named in 1995 to unite gnathostomulids and rotifers. Micrognathozoans were soon added to this grouping. Chaetognaths, long considered a distinct lineage with no close relatives, were identified as gnathiferans in 2019.

A similar grouping, Acanthognatha, was suggested in 1998 to unite gastrotrichs with gnathostomulids and rotifers. However, gastrotrichs are more closely related to lophotrochozoans than gnathiferans.

"Chaetognathiferans" was originally proposed as an informal term and later transformed into the formal name Chaetognathifera, with a proper cladistic definition: "the smallest clade including Adineta vaga (Rotifera) and Parasagitta elegans (Chaethognatha)," while Gnathifera was defined as "the smallest clade including Adineta vaga (Rotifera) and Gnathostomula paradoxa (Gnathostomulida)."
