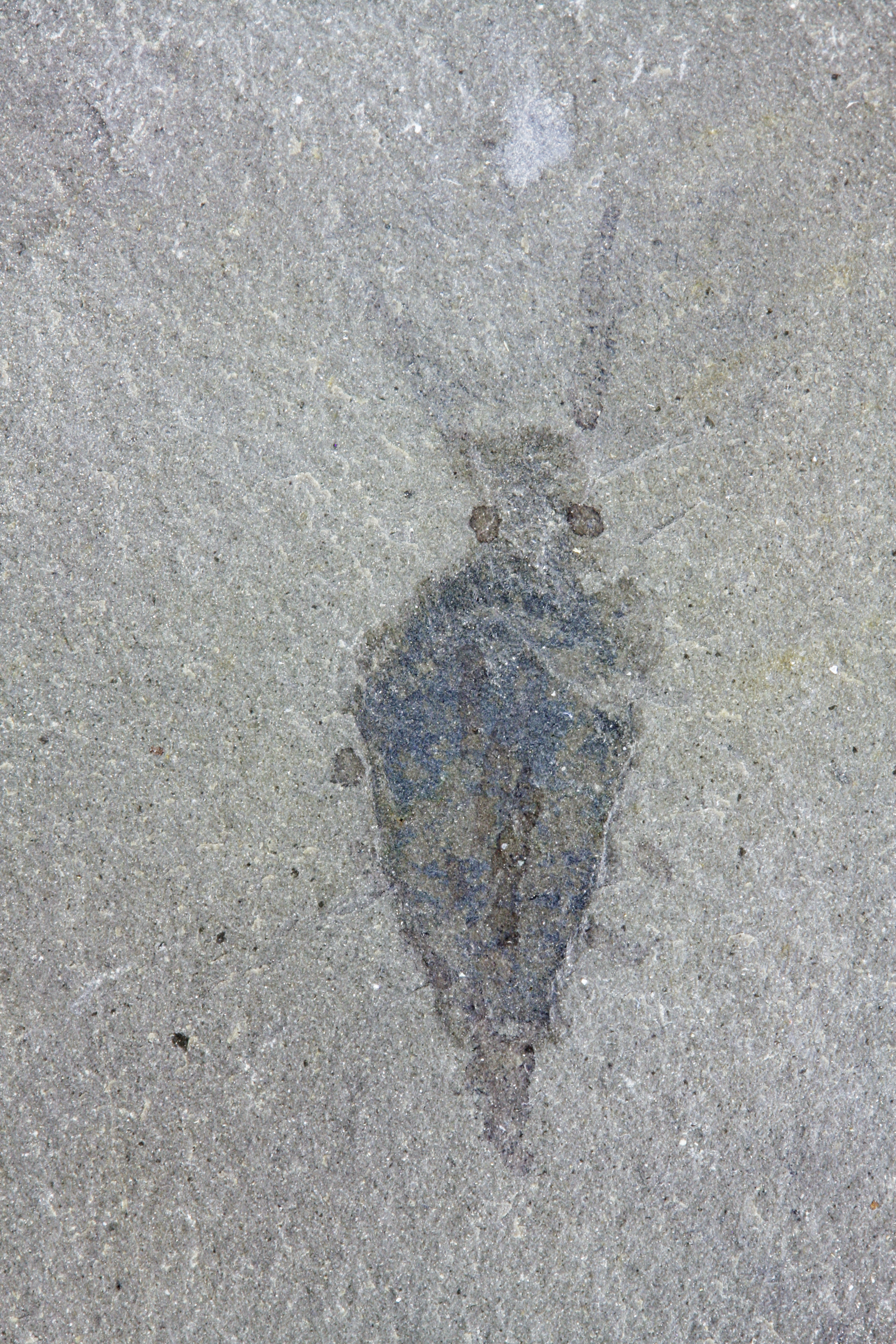
- Type specimen (from Smith, 2019)

Scientific classification
- Kingdom: Animalia
- Family: †Nectocarididae (?)
- Genus: †Nectocotis; Smith, 2020
- Species: †N. rusmithi

Binomial name
- †Nectocotis rusmithi Smith, 2020

= Nectocotis =

Nectocotis Temporal range: Katian

Extinct animal genus

Nectocotis rusmithi is a genus of Ordovician animal with uncertain affinity, found in the Whetstone Gulf Formation, New York State. It was originally described as a nectocaridid, differing from Nectocaris in the possession of an internal skeletal element, and this character was taken as evidence that this group is a stem group cephalopod. However, study in 2025, which considered nectocaridids as stem chaetognaths, did not include this taxon to nectocarididae due to lack of diagnostic features.
