= Ankalodous =

Ankalodous Temporal range: Cambrian Stage 3

Scientific classification
- Domain: Eukaryota
- Kingdom: Animalia
- Phylum: Chaetognatha
- Genus: †Ankalodous
- Species: †A. sericus

Binomial name
- †Ankalodous sericus Shu et al, 2017

Cambrian genus of chaetognath

Ankalodous is a Cambrian genus of chaetognath from the Maotianshan Shales of China. It contains one species, Ankalodous sericus.

Ankalodous is only known from unusual bundles of spines alongside a few plate-like structures. The bundles of spines typically consist of six or seven spines each, although those closer to the mouth have only two to three. These spines are roughly 7 mm long at most, but decrease towards the mouth, likely to enable closing the jaws. While the spines closest to the mouth are essentially straight, the rest are slender, long and slightly recurved with smooth surfaces. These spines seem to be made of a resistant carbonaceous material, likely chitin due to it being used in modern chaetognath jaws. The plate-like structures are located between the spines and also seem to be carbonaceous, however due to the dissimilarity to any Maotianshan Shales fauna they are likely not trapped prey. The location between the spines suggests they may be a cephalic shield, and a similar structure in modern chaetognaths helps protect the area against struggling prey. Ankalodous was likely predatory, due to its elongate spines. Due to the lack of postcranial material, its habitat is uncertain. If it was benthic, it may have behaved somewhat like an antlion larva. This fossil was interpreted as transitional between modern chaetognaths and Dakorhachis, however a 2022 study found Dakorhachis to not be a chaetognath at all.

The genus name Ankalodous is derived from the words ankalos "bundle", and odous "teeth". The species name sericus translates to "silk", as an oblique reference to Xi'an, the starting point of the Silk Road.
