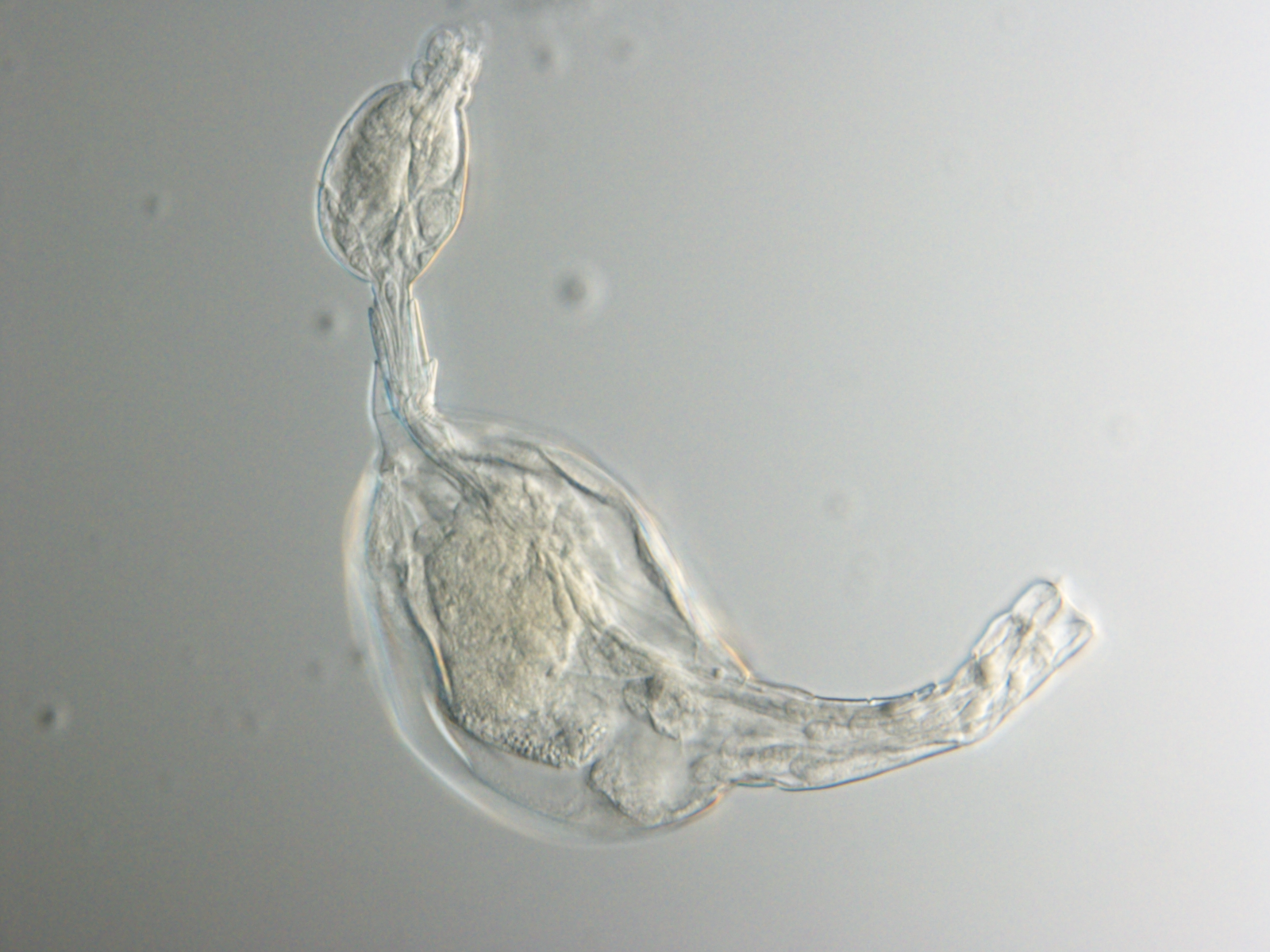
- Seison africanus

Scientific classification
- Kingdom: Animalia
- Phylum: Rotifera
- Class: Seisonidea
- Order: Seisonida
- Family: Seisonidae
- Genus: Seison; Grube, 1861

Species
- Seison africanus; Seison nebaliae

= Seison =

Genus of rotifers

Seison is a genus of rotifers belonging to the family Seisonidae.

Species:

- Seison africanus Sørensen, Segers & Funch, 2005
- Seison nebaliae Grube, 1859
