= Paraseison =

Scientific classification
- Kingdom: Animalia
- Phylum: Rotifera
- Class: Seisonidea
- Order: Seisonida
- Family: Seisonidae; Plate, 1887
- Genus: Paraseison (Claus, 1876)

Species
- Paraseison annulatus; Paraseison kisfaludyi

Genus of rotifers

Paraseison is a genus of rotifers belonging to the family Seisonidae. The only species was thought to have been P. annulatus, which is found within Europe and North America, until 2011, when P. kisfaludyi was discovered.
