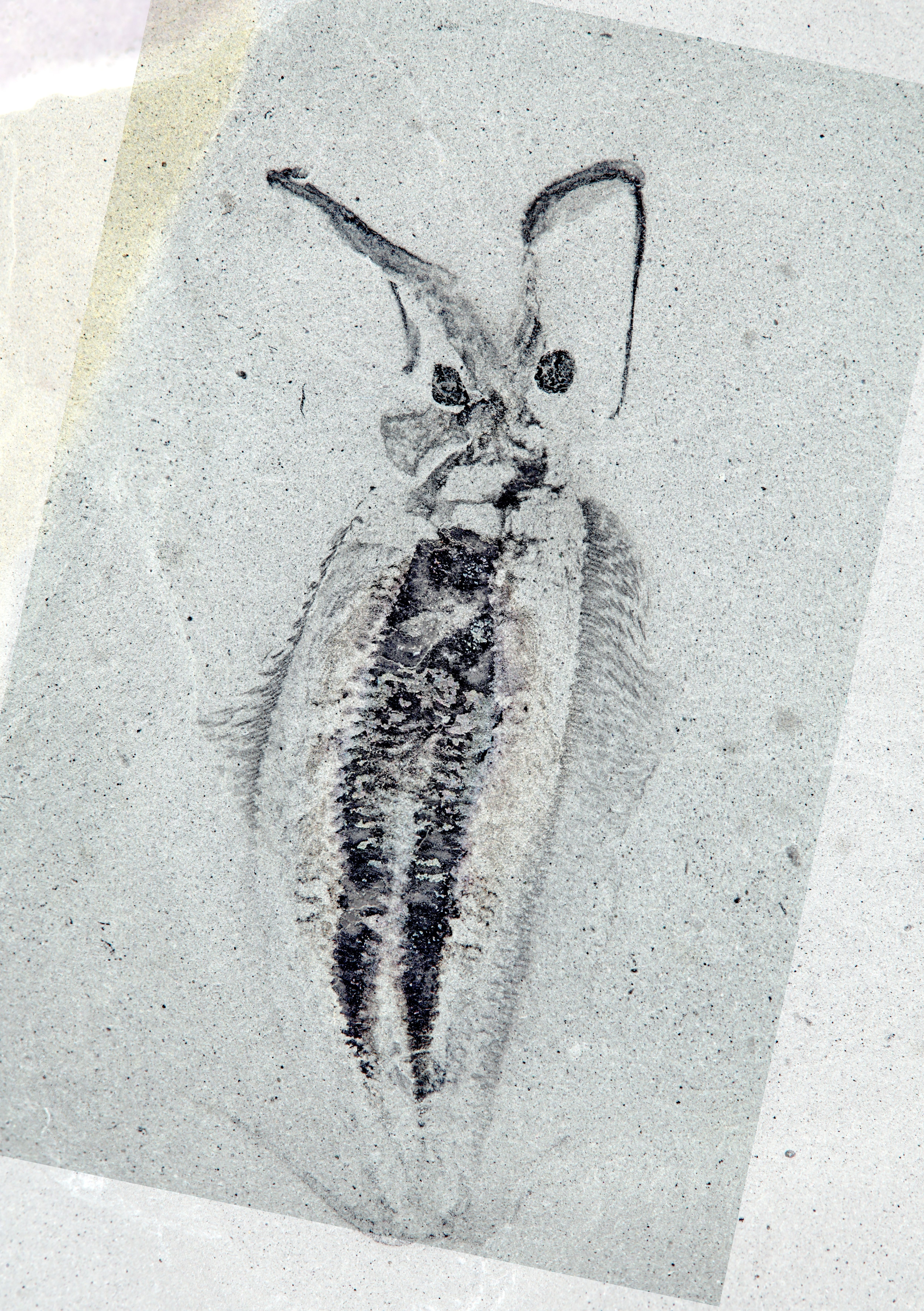
- Nectocaris pteryx, specimen ROM 60079
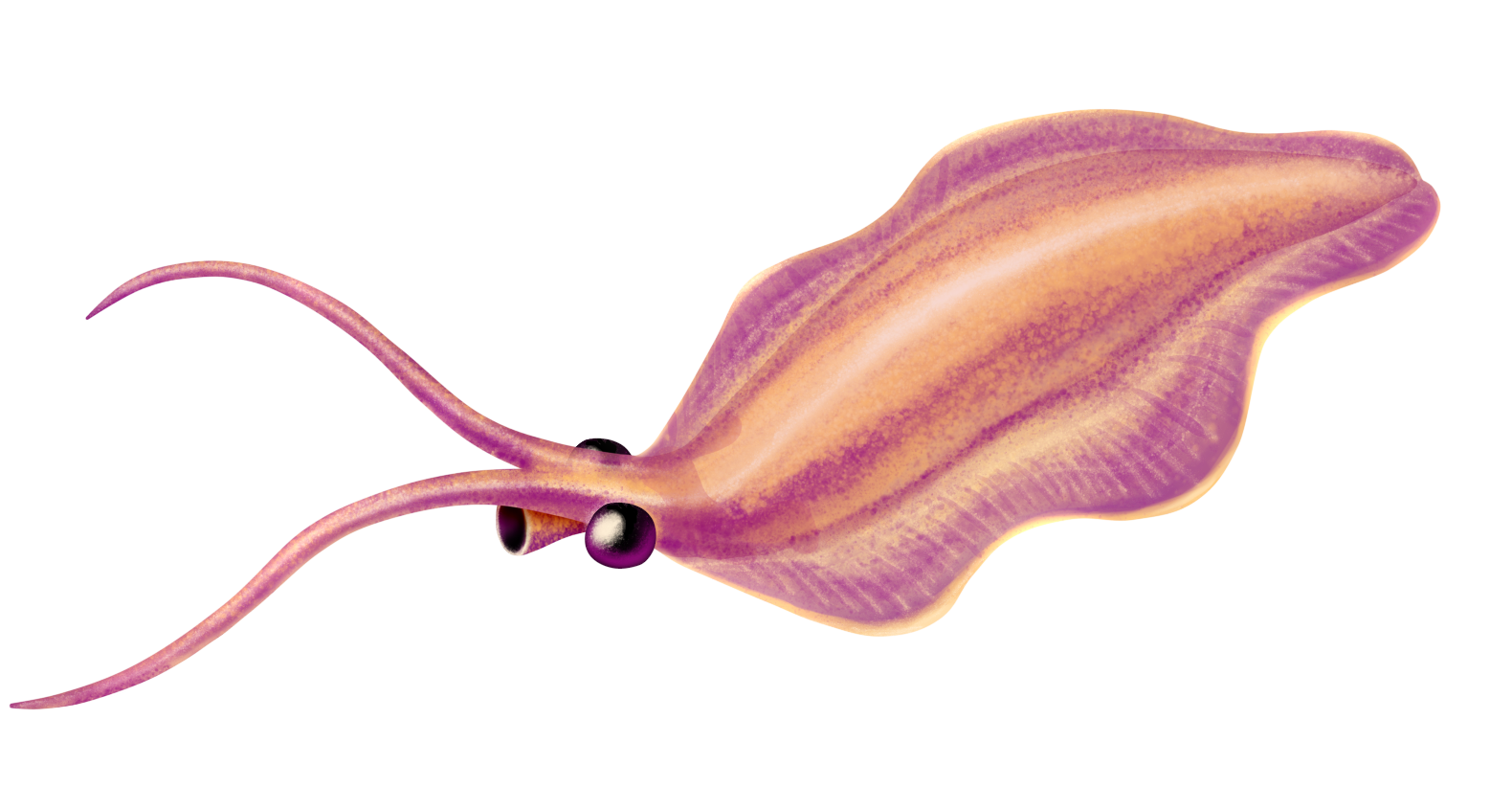
- Life restoration of Nectocaris

Scientific classification
- Kingdom: Animalia
- Stem group: Chaetognatha
- Family: †Nectocarididae; Conway Morris, 1976

Genera
- Nectocaris Conway Morris, 1976; Nectocotis? Smith, 2019; Nektognathus Vinther et al., 2025

= Nectocarididae =

Nectocarididae Temporal range: 520–461 Ma

Extinct animal family

Nectocarididae is a controversial family of animals that superficially resemble squids. Represented by Nectocaris (=Vetustovermis, Petalilium?) and Nektognathus from the Cambrian period (as well as possibly Nectocotis from the Ordovician). Some researchers claim they are cephalopods, however, this is heavily disputed and most reject this claim. A 2025 paper describing the new genus Nektognathus found paired jaw elements in both it and Nectocaris which revealed them to be related to chaetognaths (arrow worms), in particular the superficially similar Timorebestia, due to the jaw elements being homologous to those of other chateognathiferans, as well as the possession of nerve structure called the "ventral ganglion" characteristic of chaetognaths.

== Taxonomy ==
=== Phylogeny ===
The following cladogram shows the evolutionary relationships of chaetognathiferans after Vinther et al. 2025.

- Chaetognathifera
  - Gnathifera s.s.
    - Gnathostomulida
    - - Micrognathozoa
      - Rotifera
  - - - †Timorebestia
      - †Nectocarididae
    - - †Amiskwia
      - Chaetognatha (arrow worms)

=== List of genera ===
- Nectocaris
- Nectocotis? Not diagnostic for the family
- Vetustovermis? Synonym of Nectocaris
- Petalilium? Synonym of Nectocaris
- Nektognathus
