= Dakorhachis =

Dakorhachis Temporal range: Guzhangian

Scientific classification
- Kingdom: Animalia
- Clade: ParaHoxozoa
- Clade: Bilateria
- Phylum: incertae sedis
- Genus: †Dakorhachis; Conway Morris et al, 2020

Type species
- †Dakorhachis thambus Conway Morris et al, 2020

Extinct genus of enigmatic animal

Dakorhachis is a Cambrian genus of enigmatic worm, from the Weeks Formation of Canada. It contains one species, Dakorhachis thambus.

== Description ==
Dakorhachis is roughly 3 cm long and 7 mm wide, with a rounded trunk termination. The trunk lacks appendages, however around 30 bands are present which are roughly 0.8 mm wide and interpreted as segments. The main feature of Dakorhachis is the feeding apparatus. This apparatus has at least six teeth which formed a circum-oral circlet. These teeth are narrow and triangular in shape with a gently convex curve on their outer surface alongside a prominent longitudinal ridge. The inner surface is concave with very narrow ridges on the margins. These teeth seem to be fibrous, with one broken tooth showing a hollow interior. These teeth were likely composed of calcite, alongside smaller hook-like, V-shaped and rod-like structures progressively further into the mouth. Since Dakorhachis lacks fins it was almost certainly benthic, with the co-association of multiple individuals suggesting a gregarious nature. The teeth suggest it may have acted similar to antlion larvae, being semi-sessile and an ambush predator.

== Phylogeny ==
In the paper where it was described, Dakorhachis was placed within Gnathifera due to its worm-like shape and complex jaw array, likely as a basal member sharing features of both "classical" gnathiferans and chaetognaths, which shows that the basal gnathiferan was likely large, predatory and segmented. However, a 2022 paper rejects this due to the arrangement of the jaw apparatus, the circular body shape and the trunk annulations aligning it more with Scalidophora.

== Etymology ==
Dakorhachis translates to "ridged biter" which is assumed to be due to the ridges on its teeth and the animal's assumed carnivorous diet. thambus translates to "astonishment", likely due to the lack of any similar forms in the fossil record.
