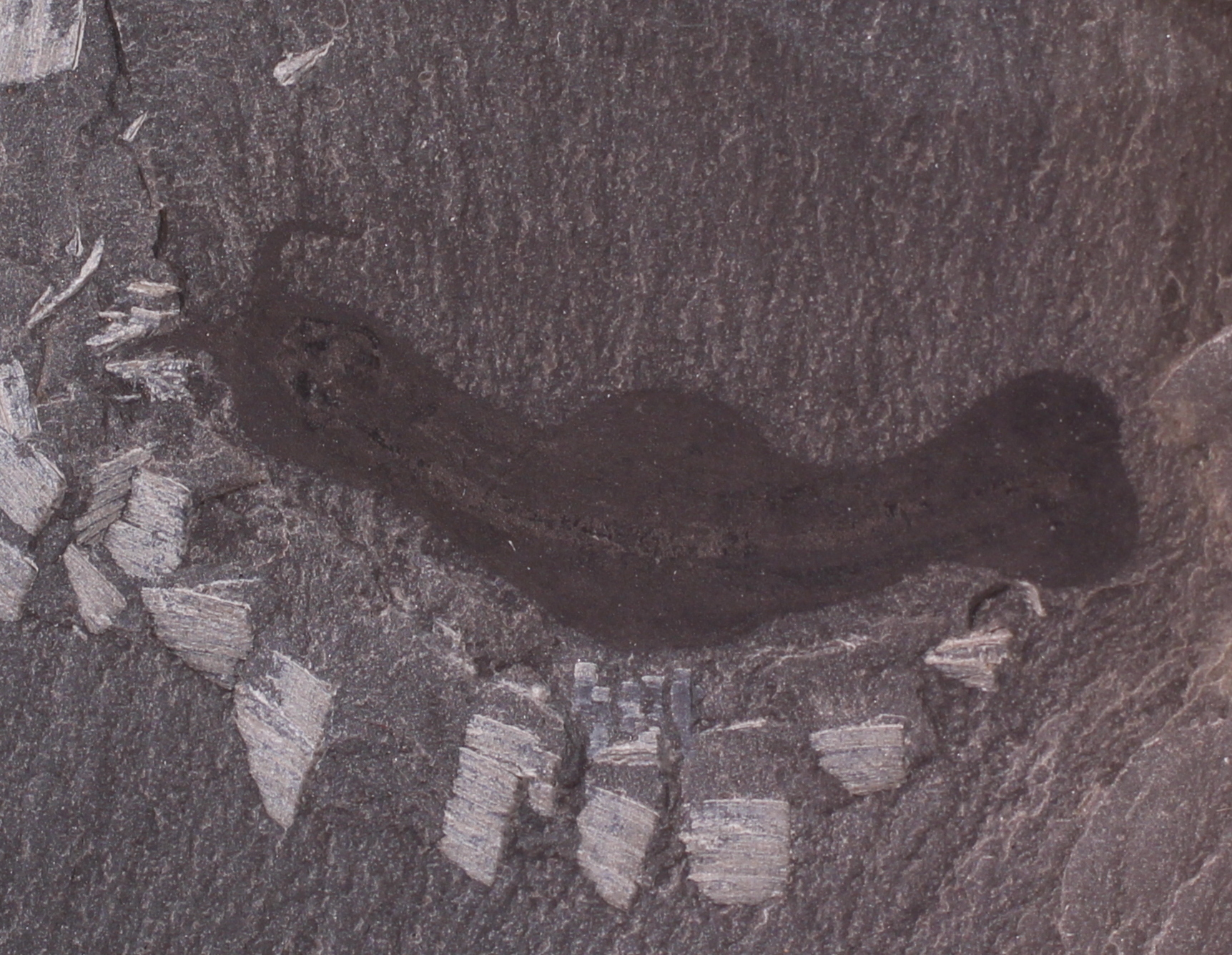
- Fossil of Amiskwia sagittiformis from the Burgess Shale

Scientific classification
- Kingdom: Animalia
- Clade: Spiralia
- Clade: Gnathifera
- Clade: Cucullophora
- Genus: †Amiskwia; Walcott, 1911

Type species
- Amiskwia sagittiformis Walcott, 1911

Species
- A. sagittiformis; A. sinica Luo & Hu, 2002

= Amiskwia =

Amiskwia Temporal range: Cambrian Stage 3–Middle Cambrian

Genus of extinct, gnathiferan worms

Amiskwia is a genus of soft-bodied marine animals known from fossils of the Middle Cambrian Lagerstätten both in the Burgess Shale in British Columbia, Canada and the Maotianshan shales of Yunnan Province, China. It is interpreted as a member of the clade Gnathifera sensu lato, as a close relative of modern chaetognaths (arrow worms).

== Etymology ==
The scientific name Amiskwia sagittiformis derives from the Cree amiskwi, "beavertail", a name of various objects in Yoho National Park, and from the Latin sagitta ("arrow") and formis ("shape"), in reference to the general appearance of the animal. "Sinica", of A. sinica, refers to that species' origin from China.

== Description ==
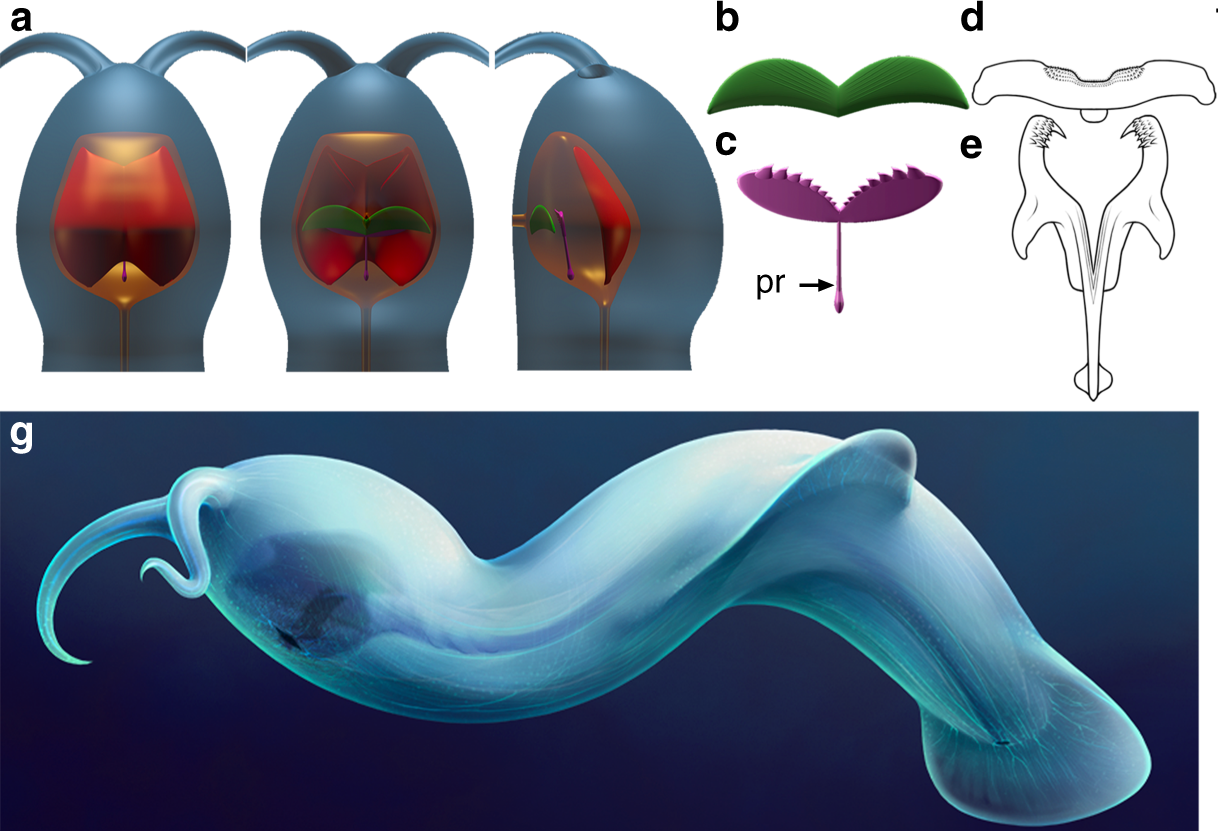
Diagram, showing the arrangements of the jaws and plates in the mouth (a) morphology of the ventral plate (b) and jaws (c) in comparison to equivalent elements of gnathostomulids (d, e) and life restoration (g)

Known specimens of Amiskwia vary in length from 7.4 to 31.3 millimetres (0.29 to 1.23 in) and in width from 0.5 to 5.5 millimetres (0.020 to 0.217 in). The body was somewhat flattened. The head had a pair of tentacles that emerged from the midline of the head. The tentacles had a relatively thick base and tapered to a point. Along the sides of the trunk were a pair of lateral fins, which were around one third of the total body length. The trunk terminated with a flat, rounded caudal fin. The gut was straight, and ran from the mouth to the anus, which was located on the underside of the body near the caudal fin. Within the mouth is a pair of semi-circular structures, described as "jaws" each bearing 8-10 conical spikes, which increased in size away from the midline of the structure. Two other structures, dubbed the "dorsal plate" and "ventral plate", are also present in the mouth.

== Phylogeny ==
The following cladogram shows the evolutionary relationships of Amiskwia as in Vinther et al. 2025.

- Chaetognathifera
  - Gnathifera s.s.
    - Gnathostomulida
    - - Micrognathozoa
      - Rotifera
  - - - †Timorebestia
      - †Nectocarididae
    - - †Amiskwia
      - Chaetognatha (arrow worms)

== Ecology ==
Amiskwia was likely a freely swimming (nektonic) organism that was either a predator or a scavenger.

== History of research ==
Amiskwia was originally categorized by paleontologist Charles Walcott. Walcott thought he saw three buccal spines in the fossils, and therefore categorized Amiskwia as a chaetognath worm (arrow worm). However, Amiskwia appears to lack the characteristic grasping spines and teeth of other Burgess fossil arrow worms. Later scientists suggested an affinity with the nemerteans (ribbon worms), but the evidence for this was somewhat inadequate. Conway Morris, on re-examining of the Burgess Shale fauna in the 1970s, described it as being the single known species in an otherwise unknown phylum, given that it has two tentacles near its mouth, rather than the characteristic single tentacle of true nemerteans. (Nemerteans do not have a single tentacle. However, a pair of antero-lateral tentacles is present in two of the many genera of pelagic nemerteans. Nemerteans do have a single eversible—normally internal—proboscis, which when everted could resemble an anterior median tentacle if fossilized. Whether retracted or everted, the proboscis is the only structure in pelagic nemerteans likely to fossilize, as it is the only structure with substantial connective tissue and muscle. The body wall has almost no muscle or connective tissue and is exceedingly unlikely to fossilize; hence, a pelagic nemertean fossil would be only the proboscis). Butterfield implies from the appearance of the fossils that the organisms may have lacked a cuticle: while this is also true of the nemerteans, these organisms lack a coelom and are thus unlikely to fossilise. He goes on to argue that the absence of cuticle is characteristic of the chaetognaths; whilst teeth would be expected, a similar fossil, Wiwaxia, shows such structures in only 10% of the expected instances, and anomalocaridids are often found detached from their mouthparts, so the absence may be taphonomic rather than genuine. The absence of spines could simply mean that the fossils represent young organisms — or that later chaetognath evolution involved paedomorphosis.

Two studies published in 2019 redescribed Amiskwia. Vinther and Parry (2019) argued that Amiskwia was a stem-group chaetognath, while Caron and Cheung (2019) suggested that the organism was a total group gnathiferan, based on the presence of gnathiferan-like jaws and ventral plates within the mouth. Its precise affinity within this group is difficult to resolve, they suggested that if it fell in the stem lineage of any extant phylum then it would be a gnathostomulid. A 2022 study supported a stem-chaetognath interpretation, suggesting that gnathiferan-like jaws were lost in the ancestor of chaetognaths. A 2024 study again supported a stem-chaetognath position.

== See also ==
- Paleobiota of the Burgess Shale
