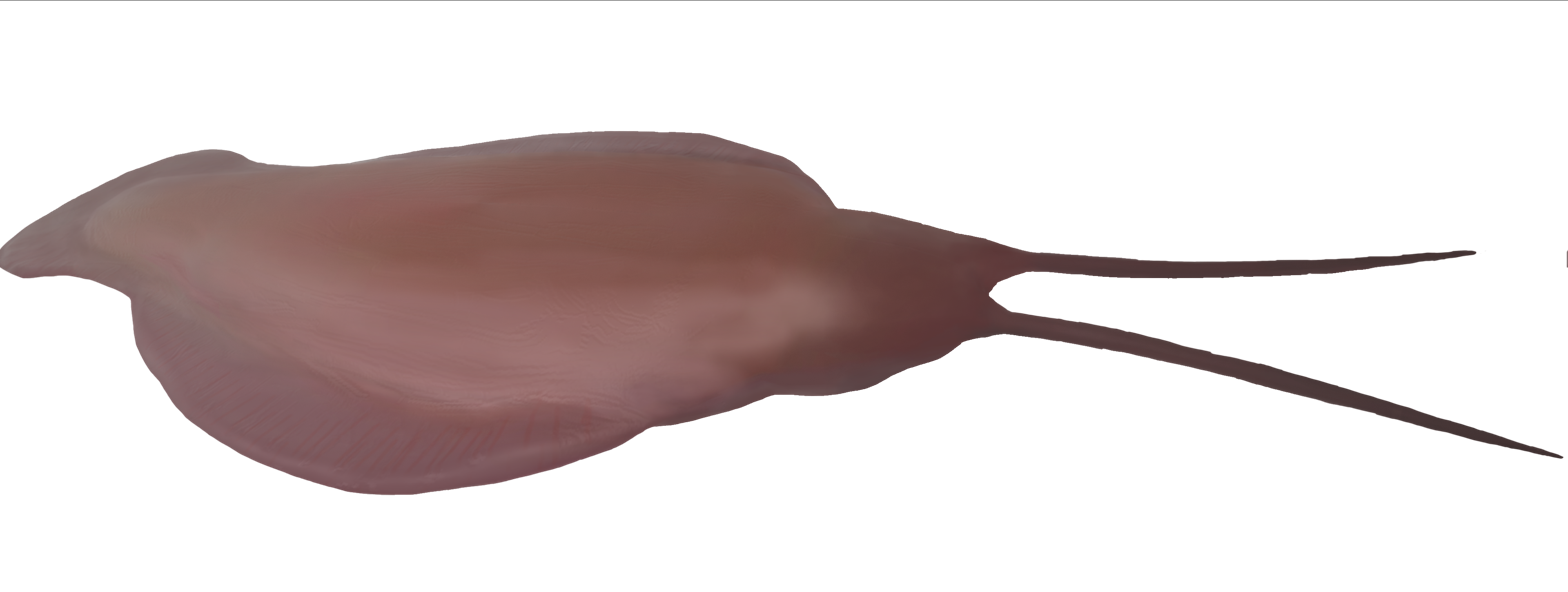
- 3D reconstruction of Timorebestia koprii

Scientific classification
- Kingdom: Animalia
- Clade: Cucullophora
- Stem group: Chaetognatha
- Genus: †Timorebestia; Park et al., 2024
- Species: †T. koprii

Binomial name
- †Timorebestia koprii Park et al., 2024

= Timorebestia =

Timorebestia Temporal range: Cambrian Stage 3

Extinct genus of arrow worm

Timorebestia koprii is an extinct species of stem-group chaetognath (arrow worm relative) that lived about 520 million years ago, in the Cambrian. Its fossils are known from the Sirius Passet Lagerstätte in Greenland, and it was first described in 2024.

== Description ==
Timorebestia has a wide body marginally surrounded by continuous rayed fins: a pair of lateral fins and a rounded caudal fin. The anterior region is a short head, bearing a pair of antennae as long as half of the body length. The mouth opened below the head, with internal jaw apparatus consisting of paired subtriangular elements, blunt anterior elements, and an unpaired anterior, possibly ventral or basal plate. Rows of longitudinal and transverse muscles surround the wide trunk region. The digestive tract terminates at the base of caudal fin. It also has a pair of well-defined ventral ganglia that identifies it as a chaetognath, but was probably more basal to modern arrow worms than Amiskwia.

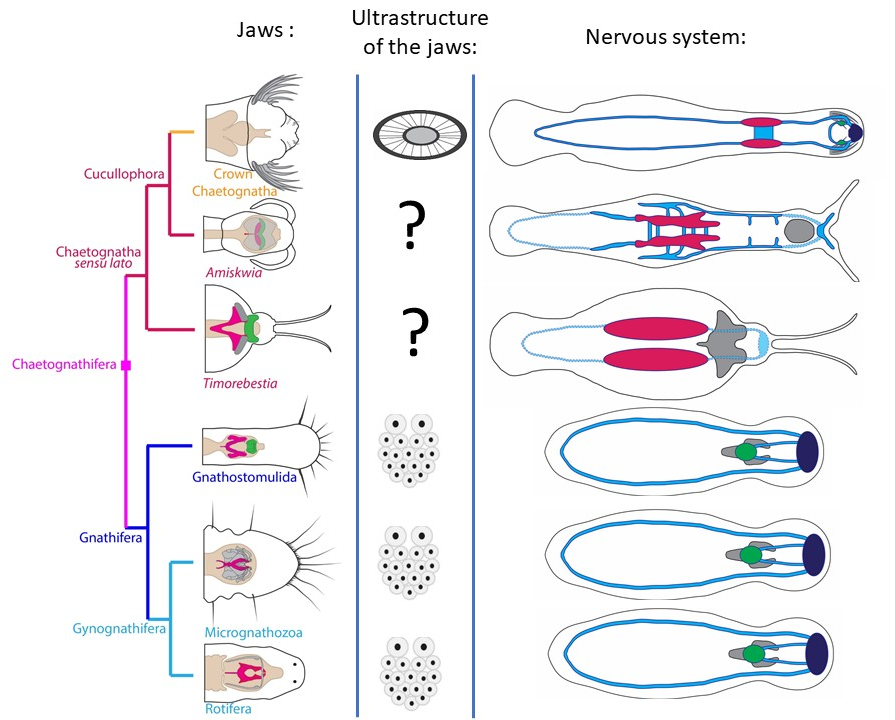
Hypothesis of the possible homology between the jaw parts and nervous system parts of extant and extinct Chaetognathifera taxa. Putative homologies between jaw parts and nervous system respectively have the same color. Questionable, and/or, disputable homologies are in grey. Non observed parts of the nervous system are in dotted lines. Only the anterior part of each organism is represented for the jaws. Modified from Bekkouche and Gąsiorowski 2022

As of January 2024, 13 known specimens have been assigned to this species, ranging from 2.2 cm to more than 20 cm in body length (the largest specimen had a body length of ~206 mm in addition to 92-mm-long antennae).

== Paleoecology ==
Compared to extant chaetognaths, which are planktonic and rarely grow beyond 10 cm, Timorebestia was much larger, up to 20 cm (30 cm when antennae included), and occupied a higher trophic level. This suggests that back in the Cambrian, chaetognaths constituted an important group of nektonic predators alongside various panarthropod groups like the radiodonts. It lived alongside other nektonic Sirius Passet fauna such as Kerygmachela, Kiisortoqia, Pauloterminus, Isoxys and so on. Some specimens with gut contents suggest it prey on the small and abundant arthropod Isoxys volucris. Timorebestia is thought to be one of the earliest examples of an apex predator.

== Phylogeny ==
The following dendrogram shows the evolutionary relationships of Timorebestia as in Vinther et al. 2025.

- Chaetognathifera
  - Gnathifera s.s.
    - Gnathostomulida
    - - Micrognathozoa
      - Rotifera
  - - - †Timorebestia
      - †Nectocarididae
    - - †Amiskwia
      - Chaetognatha (arrow worms)

== Etymology ==
The genus name is derived from the Latin words timor (fear) and bestia (beast) which translates to "fear-causing beast". The species name is derived from the Korea Polar Research Institute (KOPRI), who has helped with the expeditions to the lagerstätte.
