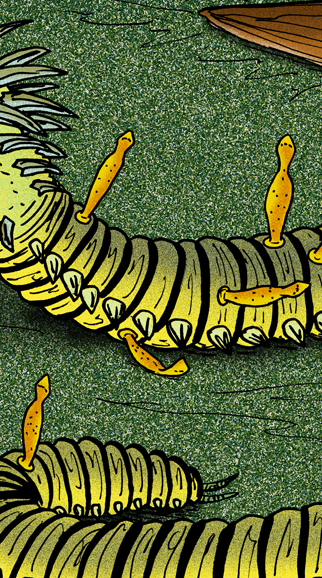
- Restoration of individuals on host, Cricocosmia sp.

Scientific classification
- Domain: Eukaryota
- Kingdom: Animalia
- Clade: Gnathifera
- Genus: †Inquicus; Cong, et al 2017
- Species: †I. fellatus

Binomial name
- †Inquicus fellatus Cong, et al 2017

= Inquicus =

Inquicus Temporal range: Early Cambrian

Extinct bottle-shaped parasitic worm

Inquicus fellatus is an extinct, bowling pin-shaped gnathiferan worm from the Chengjiang Biota, in what was once a marine environment from the Early Cambrian Yunnan province. Its fossils are found attached to fossils of the worms Cricocosmia and Mafangscolex in either a parasitic or commensalistic relationship.

== Description ==
Inquicus individuals were up to three centimeters long, shaped like a bowling pin with an elongated body that tapered to a slightly bulbous head. They attached their bottom ends to their hosts, with their feeding appendages facing outwards and away from their hosts' bodies.

== Behavior ==
Although Inquicus attached to host worms, it is unlikely that the relationship was directly parasitic. The attachment point of Inquicus did not penetrate the skin of the hosts, but rather attached through suction. The species also was stiff, with there being no evidence that it could bend its mouth backwards to feed on the host. It is more likely that they simply rode on their hosts while browsing for food, or used them as a form of locomotion.
