= Lamellipedia =

Lamellipedia Temporal range: Early Cambrian–Late Permian

Scientific classification
- Kingdom: Animalia
- Phylum: Arthropoda
- (unranked): Lamellipedia Hou and Bergstrom, 1997

Subgroups
- Artiopoda; Marrellomorpha

Lamellipedia is a proposed clade of arthropods, including trilobites and their relatives (Artiopoda) and Marrellomorpha. This relationship is not consistently recovered in phylogenetic analyses, though it has seen some support.
