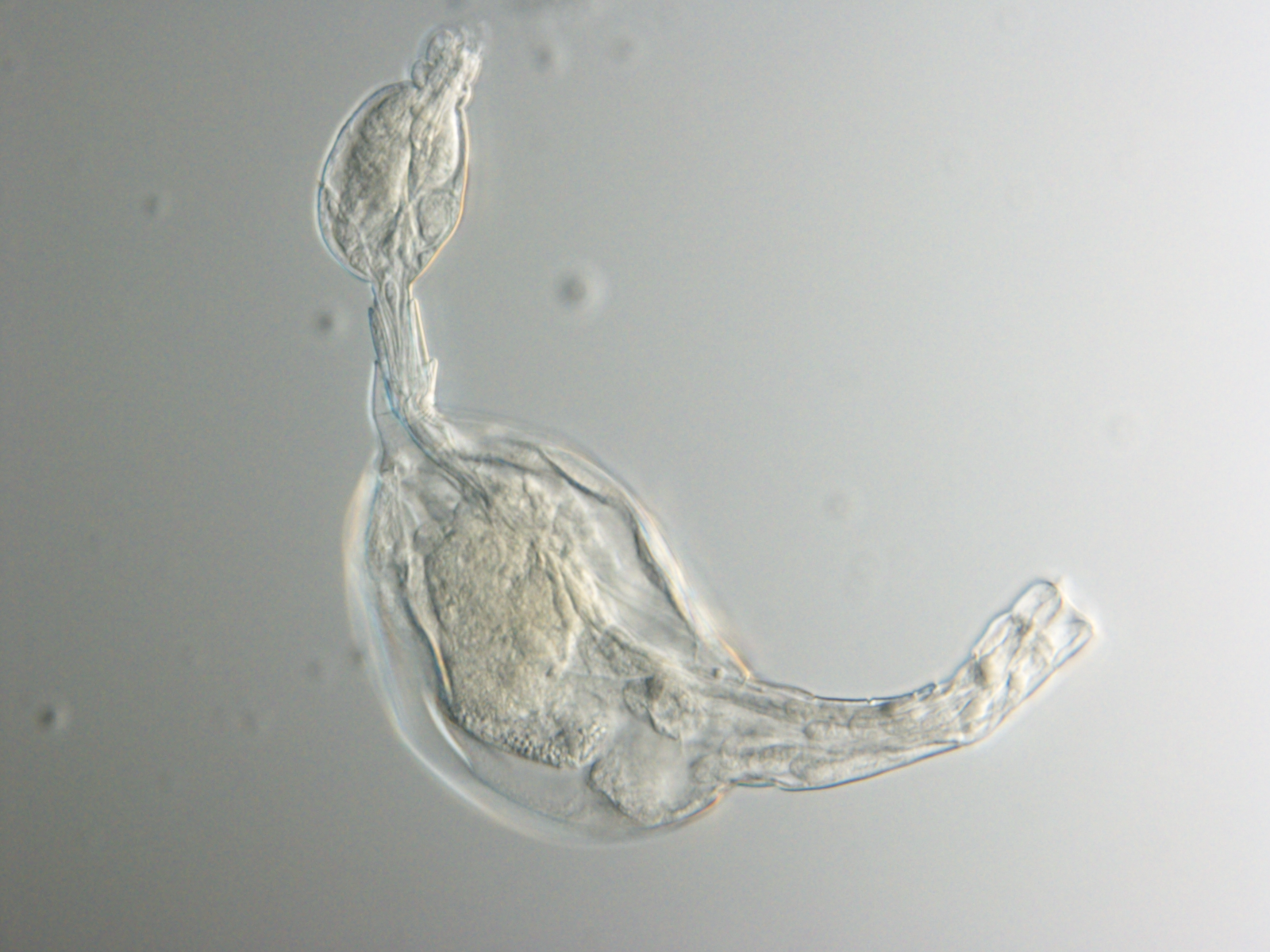
- Seison africanus

Scientific classification
- Kingdom: Animalia
- Phylum: Rotifera
- Class: Seisonidea
- Order: Seisonida
- Family: Seisonidae; Wesenberg-Lund, 1899

Genera
- Paraseison; Seison

Synonyms
- Seisonacea (for order)

= Seisonidae =

Family of rotifers

Seisonidae is a family of rotifers, found on the gills of Nebalia, a marine crustacean. Peculiar among rotifers, they are gonochoric; males and females are both present and are equal in size. Both sexes are similar with paired gonads. It is considered to have diverged from the other rotifers early on, and in one treatment is placed in a separate class Seisonoidea. They have a large and elongate body with reduced corona. Their muscular system is similar to that of other rotifers: they have longitudinal muscles as well as open annular muscles. Being attached for most of their life, they are semi-sessile, but are capable of detaching and crawl short distances if required.

Feeding has never been observed directly, but the stomach in Seison nebaliae contained bacteria, while a substance that probably represents hemolymph of the Nebalia host was found in the stomach of Paraseison annulatus. The latter prefer to settle beneath the carapace on the gills of the host's legs, and the former is usually found on the host's carapase, trunk or legs. Their host often lives in tidal puddles with decomposing algae for a limited period of time, with oxygen content so low it sometimes reaches anoxia, which doesn't seem to bother the Seisonidae.

== Species ==
Two genera with total four species belong to Seisonidae:

- Paraseison Plate, 1887
  - Paraseison annulatus (Claus, 1876) — ectoparasite of Nebalia
  - Paraseison kisfaludyi
- Seison Grube, 1861
  - Seison nebaliae Grube, 1861 – commensal of Nebalia
  - Seison africanus Sorensen, Segers & Funch, 2005 — host is unknown.
