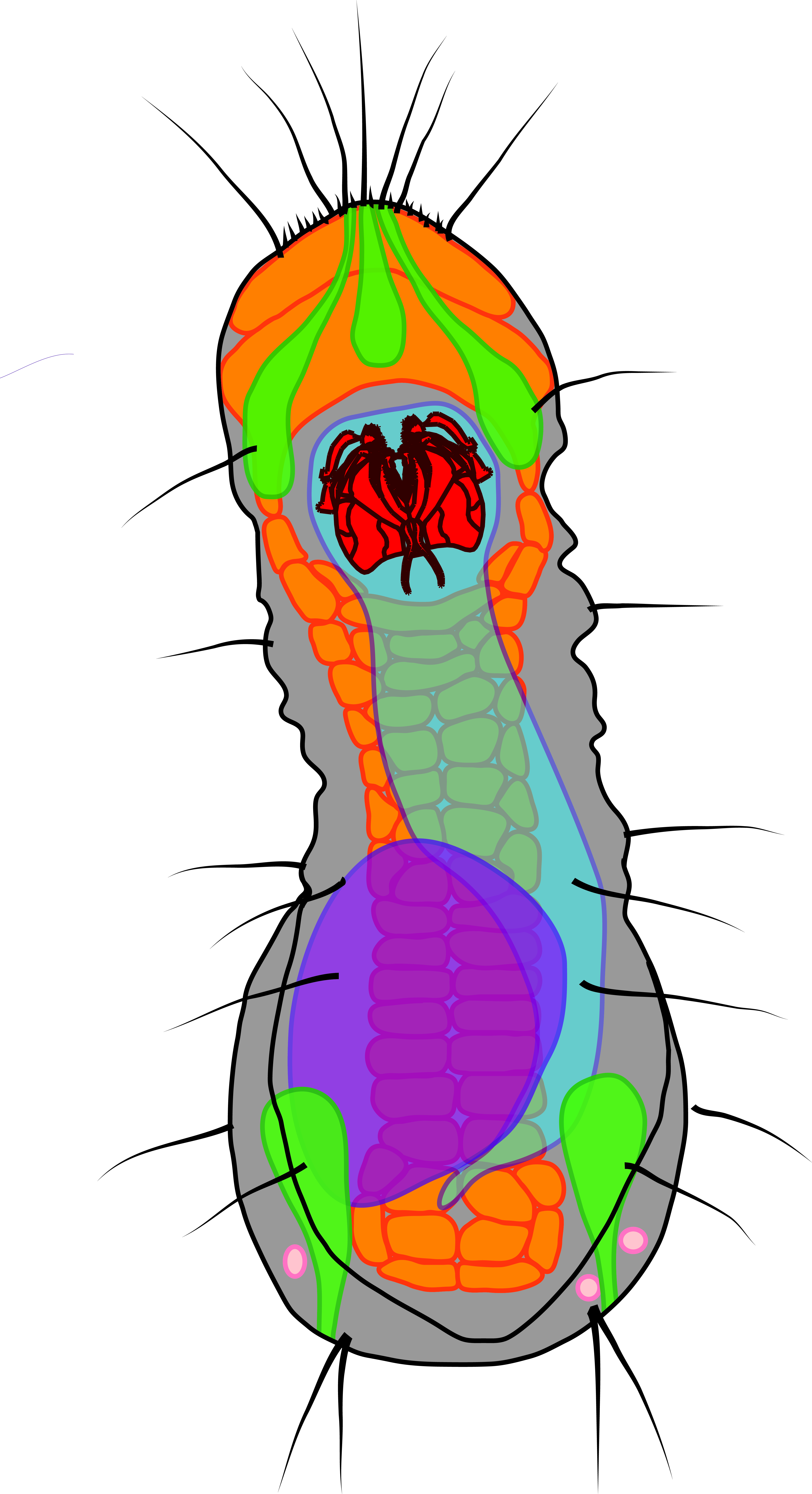
- Schematic drawing of Limnognathia maerski
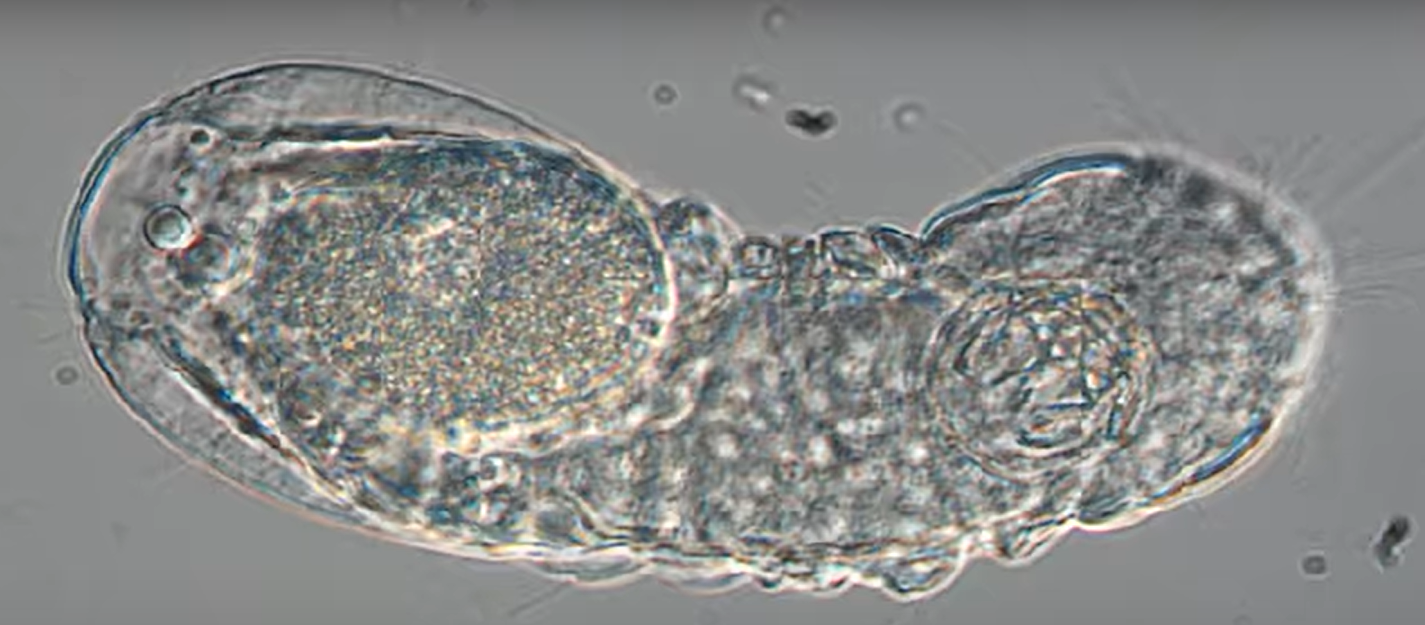
- Microscopic view of L. maerski

Scientific classification
- Kingdom: Animalia
- Subkingdom: Eumetazoa
- Clade: ParaHoxozoa
- Clade: Bilateria
- Clade: Nephrozoa
- Clade: Protostomia
- Clade: Spiralia
- Clade: Gnathifera
- Phylum: Micrognathozoa; Funch & Kristensen, 1995
- Order: Limnognathida; Funch & Kristensen, 1995
- Family: Limnognathiidae; Funch & Kristensen, 1995
- Genus: Limnognathia; Funch & Kristensen, 1995

Species
- Limnognathia maerski Funch & Kristensen, 2000; Limnognathia desmeti Worsaae & Møller, 2025

= Limnognathia =

Genus of microscopic freshwater animal

Limnognathia is a genus of microscopic acoelomate freshwater animal that was discovered in Disko Island, Greenland, in 1994. Since then, it has also been found on the Crozet Islands of Antarctica as well as in the British Isles and the Spanish Pyrenees, suggesting a worldwide distribution. There are two known species of Limnognathia: L. maerski, described in 2000, and L. desmeti, described in 2025.

Limnognathia is the only genus in the phylum Micrognathozoa ("small-jawed animal").

== Description ==
=== Feeding ===
Limnognathia mainly feeds on bacteria, blue-green algae, and diatoms. It has complex jaws, with fifteen separate elements; these elements are very small, ranging from 4 μm to 14 μm. The animal can extend part of its jaw outside its mouth while eating. It also extends much of its jaw outside its mouth when it is regurgitating indigestible items.

=== Anatomy ===
Limnognathia has a large ganglion, or 'brain', in its head, and paired nerve cords extending along the lower side of the body towards the tail. Stiff sensory bristles made up of one to three cilia are scattered about the body. These bristles are similar to ones found on gnathostomulids, but up to three cilia may arise from a single cell in Limnognathia, while gnathostomulids have only one cilium per cell.

Flexible cilia are arranged in a horseshoe-shaped area on the forehead, and in spots on the sides of the head and in two rows on the underside of the body. The cilia on the forehead create a current that moves food particles towards the mouth, while the other cilia move the animal.

=== Reproduction ===
All specimens of Limnognathia that have been collected have had female organs. They lay two kinds of eggs: thin-walled eggs that hatch quickly, and thick-walled eggs that are believed to be resistant to freezing, and thus capable of overwintering and hatching in the spring. The same pattern is known from rotifers, where thick-walled eggs only form after fertilization by males. The youngest Limnognathia specimens collected may also have male organs, and it is now hypothesized that the animals hatch as males and later become females, a process called sequential hermaphroditism.

== Taxonomy and phylogeny ==
=== Taxonomic status ===
Limnognathia is nominally a platyzoan, but has variously been assigned as a class or subphylum in the clade Gnathifera or as a phylum in a Gnathifera superphylum, named Micrognathozoa. It is related to the rotifers and gnathostomulids, grouped together as the Gnathifera. Two species are described: Limnognathia maerski from Greenland and Spain, and Limnognathia desmeti from the Crozet Islands. The two species have no recognizable morphological differences, but genetic studies have shown them to be distinct.

=== Species ===
- Limnognathia maerski (Kristensen & Funch, 2000)
- Limnognathia desmeti (Worsaae & Møller, 2025)

=== Phylogeny ===
Cladogram showing the relationships of Limnognathia:

- Gnathifera
  - Gnathostomulida
  - - Micrognathozoa
    - Syndermata
      - Seisonida
      - - Eurotatoria
        - Acanthocephala

The Gnathifera is the sister group to the rest of the spiralians and is crucial to understand because of its relationship to animal evolution.
