= Taxonomy of the animals (Hutchins et al., 2003) =

Classification of animals according to some authorities

The taxonomy of the animals presented by Hutchins et al. in 2003 in Grzimek's Animal Life Encyclopedia is a system of classification which covers all the metazoans, from phyla to orders (or families, for Hexapoda and Pisces, or species, for Amphibia, Reptilia, Aves and Mammalia).

== Animalia (= Metazoa) ==
=== Phylum Porifera ===
- Phylum Porifera
  - Class Calcarea
    - Order Baeriida
    - Order Clathrinida
    - Order Leucosoleniida
    - Order Lithonida
    - Order Murrayonida
  - Class Hexactinellida
    - Order Amphidiscosida
    - Order Aulocalycoida
    - Order Hexactinosida
    - Order Lychniscosida
    - Order Lyssacinosida
  - Class Demospongiae
    - Order Agelasida
    - Order Astrophorida
    - Order Chondrosida
    - Order Dendroceratida
    - Order Dictyoceratida
    - Order Hadromerida
    - Order Halichondrida
    - Order Halisarcida
    - Order Haplosclerida
    - Order Homosclerophorida
    - Order Poecilosclerida
    - Order Spirophorida
    - Order Verongida
    - Order Verticillitida

=== Phylum Placozoa ===
- Phylum Placozoa
  - No order designations

=== Phylum Monoblastozoa ===
- Phylum Monoblastozoa
  - No order designations

=== Phylum Rhombozoa ===
- Phylum Rhombozoa
  - Order Dicyemida
  - Order Heterocyemida

=== Phylum Orthonectida ===
- Phylum Orthonectida
  - Order Orthonectida

=== Phylum Cnidaria ===
- Phylum Cnidaria
  - Class Anthozoa
    - Order Actiniaria
    - Order Alcyonacea
    - Order Antipatharia
    - Order Ceriantharia
    - Order Corallimorpharia
    - Order Helioporacea
    - Order Pennatulacea
    - Order Scleractinia
    - Order Zoanthidea
  - Class Hydrozoa
    - Order Actinulida
    - Order Capitata
    - Order Conica
    - Order Cystonectae
    - Order Filifera
    - Order Laingiomedusae
    - Order Limnomedusae
    - Order Moerisiida
    - Order Narcomedusa
    - Order Proboscoida
    - Order Physonectae
    - Order Polypodiozoa
    - Order Trachymedusa
  - Class Cubozoa
    - Order Cubomedusae
  - Class Scyphozoa
    - Order Coronatae
    - Order Rhizostomeae
    - Order Semaeostomeae
    - Order Stauromedusae

=== Phylum Ctenophora ===
- Phylum Ctenophora
  - Order Beroida
  - Order Cestida
  - Order Cydippida
  - Order Ganeshida
  - Order Lobata
  - Order Platyctenida
  - Order Thalassocalycida

=== Phylum Platyhelminthes ===
- Phylum Platyhelminthes
  - Class Acoela
    - No order designations
  - Class Turbellaria
    - Order Catenulida
    - Order Haplopharyngida
    - Order Lecithoepitheliata
    - Order Macrostomida
    - Order Polycladida
    - Order Prolecithophora
    - Order Proplicastomata
    - Order Proseriata
    - Order Rhabdocoela
    - Order Tricladida
  - Class Trematoda
    - Order Aspidogastrida
    - Order Azygiida
    - Order Echinostomida
    - Order Opisthorchiida
    - Order Plagiorchiida
    - Order Strigeatida
  - Class Monogenea
    - Order Monopisthocotylea
    - Order Polyopisthocotylea
  - Class Cestoda
    - Order Amphilinidea
    - Order Caryophyllidea
    - Order Cyclophyllidea
    - Order Diphyllidea
    - Order Gyrocotylidea
    - Order Haplobothriidea
    - Order Lecanicephalidea
    - Order Litobothriidea
    - Order Nippotaeniidea
    - Order Proteocephalidea
    - Order Pseudophyllidea
    - Order Spathebothriidea
    - Order Tetrabothriidea
    - Order Tetraphyllidea
    - Order Trypanorhyncha

=== Phylum Nemertea ===
- Phylum Nemertea
  - Class Anopla
    - Order Heteronemertea
    - Order Palaeonemertea
  - Class Enopla
    - Order Hoplonemertea

=== Phylum Rotifera ===
- Phylum Rotifera
  - Order Bdelloida
  - Order Collothecacea
  - Order Flosculariacea
  - Order Ploimida
  - Order Seisonida

=== Phylum Gastrotricha ===
- Phylum Gastrotricha
  - Order Chaetonotida
  - Order Macrodasyida

=== Phylum Kinorhyncha ===
- Phylum Kinorhyncha
  - Order Cyclorhagida
  - Order Homalorhagida

=== Phylum Nematoda ===
- Phylum Nematoda
  - Class Adenophorea
    - Order Araeolaimida
    - Order Chromadorida
    - Order Desmodorida
    - Order Desmoscolecida
    - Order Dorylaimida
    - Order Enoplida
    - Order Isolaimida
    - Order Mermithida
    - Order Monhysterida
    - Order Mononchida
    - Order Muspiceida
    - Order Stichosomida
    - Order Trichocephalida
  - Class Secernentea
    - Order Aphelenchida
    - Order Ascaridida
    - Order Camallanida
    - Order Diplogasterida
    - Order Rhabditida
    - Order Spirurida
    - Order Strongylida
    - Order Tylenchida

=== Phylum Nematomorpha ===
- Phylum Nematomorpha
  - Order Gordioidea
  - Order Nectonematoidea

=== Phylum Acanthocephala ===
- Phylum Acanthocephala
  - Order Apororhynchida
  - Order Echinorhynchida
  - Order Gigantorhynchida
  - Order Gyracanthocephala
  - Order Moniliformida
  - Order Neoechinorhynchida
  - Order Oligacanthorhynchida
  - Order Polymorphida

=== Phylum Entoprocta ===
- Phylum Entoprocta
  - Order Coloniales
  - Order Solitaria

=== Phylum Micrognathozoa ===
- Phylum Micrognathozoa
  - Order Limnognathida

=== Phylum Gnathostomulida ===
- Phylum Gnathostomulida
  - Order Bursovaginoidea
  - Order Filospermoidea

=== Phylum Priapulida ===
- Phylum Priapulida
  - Order Halicryptomorphida
  - Order Priapulimorphida
  - Order Seticoronarida

=== Phylum Loricifera ===
- Phylum Loricifera
  - Order Nanaloricida

=== Phylum Cycliophora ===
- Phylum Cycliophora
  - Order Symbiida

=== Phylum Echinodermata ===
- Phylum Echinodermata
  - Class Crinoidea
    - Order Bourgueticrinida
    - Order Comatulida
    - Order Cyrtocrinida
    - Order Isocrinida
    - Order Millericrinida
  - Class Asteroidea
    - Order Brisingida
    - Order Forcipulatida
    - Order Notomyotida
    - Order Paxillosida
    - Order Spinulosida
    - Order Valvatida
    - Order Velatida
  - Class Concentricycloidea
    - Order Peripodida
  - Class Ophiuroidea
    - Order Euryalida
    - Order Oegophiurida
    - Order Ophiurida
  - Class Echinoidea
    - Order Arbacioida
    - Order Cassiduloida
    - Order Cidaroida
    - Order Clypeasteroida
    - Order Diadematoida
    - Order Echinoida
    - Order Echinothuroida
    - Order Holasteroida
    - Order Holectypoida
    - Order Pedinoida
    - Order Phymosomatoida
    - Order Salenoida
    - Order Spatangoida
    - Order Temnopleurida
  - Class Holothuroidea
    - Order Apodida
    - Order Aspidochirotida
    - Order Dactylochirotida
    - Order Dendrochirotida
    - Order Elasipodida
    - Order Molpadiida

=== Phylum Chaetognatha ===
- Phylum Chaetognatha
  - Order Aphragmophora
  - Order Phragmophora

=== Phylum Hemichordata ===
- Phylum Hemichordata
  - Order Cephalodiscida
  - Order Rhabdopleurida

=== Phylum Chordata ===
- Phylum Chordata
  - Subphylum Urochordata
    - Class Ascidiacea
      - Order Enterogona
      - Order Pleurogona
    - Class Thaliacea
      - Order Doliolida
      - Order Pyrosomatida
      - Order Salpida
    - Class Appendicularia
      - Order Copelata
    - Class Sorberacea
      - Order Aspiraculata
  - Subphylum Cephalochordata
    - Order Amphioxiformes
  - Subphylum Craniata

==== Superclass Pisces ====
- Superclass Pisces (polyphyletic)
  - Class Myxini
    - Order Myxiniformes
  - Class Cephalaspidomorphi
    - Order Petromyzontiformes
  - Class Chondrichthyes
    - Order Chimaeriformes
    - Order Heterodontiformes
    - Order Orectolobiformes
    - Order Carcharhiniformes
    - Order Lamniformes
    - Order Hexanchiformes
    - Order Squaliformes
    - Order Squatiniformes
    - Order Pristiophoriformes
    - Order Rajiformes
  - Class Sarcopterygii
    - Order Coelacanthiformes
    - Order Ceratodontiformes
    - Order Lepidosireniformes
  - Class Actinopterygii
    - Order Polypteriformes
    - Order Acipenseriformes
    - Order Lepisosteiformes
    - Order Amiiformes
    - Order Osteoglossiformes
    - Order Elopiformes
    - Order Albuliformes
    - Order Anguilliformes
    - Order Saccopharyngiformes
    - Order Clupeiformes
    - Order Gonorynchiformes
    - Order Cypriniformes
    - Order Characiformes
    - Order Siluriformes
    - Order Gymnotiformes
    - Order Esociformes
    - Order Osmeriformes
    - Order Salmoniformes
    - Order Stomiiformes
    - Order Aulopiformes
    - Order Myctophiformes
    - Order Lampridiformes
    - Order Polymixiiformes
    - Order Percopsiformes
    - Order Ophidiiformes
    - Order Gadiformes
    - Order Batrachoidiformes
    - Order Lophiiformes
    - Order Mugiliformes
    - Order Atheriniformes
    - Order Beloniformes
    - Order Cyprinodontiformes
    - Order Stephanoberyciformes
    - Order Beryciformes
    - Order Zeiformes
    - Order Gasterosteiformes
    - Order Synbranchiformes
    - Order Scorpaeniformes
    - Order Perciformes
      - Suborder Percoidei
      - Suborder Labroidei
      - Suborder Zoarcoidei
      - Suborder Nototheniodei
      - Suborder Trachinoidei
      - Suborder Blennioidei
      - Suborder Icosteoidei
      - Suborder Gobiesocoidei
      - Suborder Callionymoidei
      - Suborder Gobioidei
      - Suborder Acanthuroidei
      - Suborder Scombroidei
      - Suborder Stromateoidei
      - Suborder Anabantoidei
      - Suborder Channoidei
    - Order Pleuronectiformes
    - Order Tetraodontiformes

==== Class Amphibia ====
- Class Amphibia
  - Order Anura
  - Order Caudata
  - Order Gymnophiona

==== Class Reptilia ====
- Class Reptilia
  - Order Testudines
  - Order Crocodylia
  - Order Rhynchocephalia
  - Order Squamata

==== Class Aves ====
- Class Aves
  - Order Struthioniformes
  - Order Procellariiformes
  - Order Sphenisciformes
  - Order Gaviiformes
  - Order Podicipediformes
  - Order Pelecaniformes
  - Order Ciconiiformes
  - Order Phoenicopteriformes
  - Order Falconiformes
  - Order Anseriformes
  - Order Galliformes
  - Order Opisthocomiformes
  - Order Gruiformes
  - Order Charadriiformes
  - Order Pterocliformes
  - Order Columbiformes
  - Order Psittaciformes
  - Order Musophagiformes
  - Order Cuculiformes
  - Order Strigiformes
  - Order Caprimulgiformes
  - Order Apodiformes
  - Order Coliiformes
  - Order Trogoniformes
  - Order Coraciiformes
  - Order Piciformes
  - Order Passeriformes

==== Class Mammalia ====
- Class Mammalia
  - Order Monotremata
  - Order Didelphimorphia
  - Order Paucituberculata
  - Order Microbiotheria
  - Order Dasyuromorphia
  - Order Peramelemorphia
  - Order Notoryctemorphia
  - Order Diprotodontia
  - Order Xenarthra
  - Order Insectivora
  - Order Scandentia
  - Order Dermoptera
  - Order Chiroptera
  - Order Primates
  - Order Carnivora
  - Order Cetacea
  - Order Tubulidentata
  - Order Proboscidea
  - Order Hyracoidea
  - Order Sirenia
  - Order Perissodactyla
  - Order Artiodactyla
  - Order Pholidota
  - Order Rodentia
  - Order Lagomorpha
  - Order Macroscelidea

=== Phylum Annelida ===
- Phylum Annelida
  - Class Polychaeta
    - Order Amphinomida
    - Order Capitellida
    - Order Chaetopterida
    - Order Cirratulida
    - Order Cossurida
    - Order Ctenodrilida
    - Order Dinophilida
    - Order Eunicida
    - Order Flabelligerida
    - Order Magelonida
    - Order Nerillida
    - Order Opheliida
    - Order Orbiniida
    - Order Oweniida
    - Order Phyllodocida
    - Order Poeobiida
    - Order Polygordiida
    - Order Protodrilida
    - Order Psammodrilida
    - Order Sabellariida
    - Order Sabellida
    - Order Spintherida
    - Order Spionida
    - Order Sternaspida
    - Order Terebellida
  - Class Myzostomida
    - Order Pharyngidea
    - Order Proboscidea
  - Class Oligochaeta
    - Order Haplotaxida
    - Order Lumbriculida
    - Order Moniligastrida
    - Order Opisthopora
  - Class Hirudinea
    - Order Arhynchobdellae
    - Order Rhynchobdellida
  - Class Pogonophora
    - Order Athecanephria
    - Order Thecanephria

=== Phylum Vestimentifera ===
- Phylum Vestimentifera
  - Order Basibranchia
  - Order Riftiidae

=== Phylum Sipuncula ===
- Phylum Sipuncula
  - Order Aspidosiphoniformes
  - Order Golfingiaformes
  - Order Phascolosomatiformes
  - Order Sipunculiformes

=== Phylum Echiura ===
- Phylum Echiura
  - Order Bonellioinea
  - Order Echiuroinea
  - Order Heteromyota
  - Order Xenopneusta

=== Phylum Onychophora ===
- Phylum Onychophora
  - No order designations

=== Phylum Tardigrada ===
- Phylum Tardigrada
  - Order Arthrotardigrada
  - Order Echiniscoidea
  - Order Parachela
  - Order Apochela
  - Order Mesotardigrada

=== Phylum Arthropoda ===
- Phylum Arthropoda

==== Subphylum Crustacea ====
- Subphylum Crustacea
  - Class Remipedia
    - Order Nectiopoda
  - Class Cephalocarida
    - Order Brachypoda
  - Class Branchiopoda
    - Order Anostraca
    - Order Notostraca
    - Order Conchostraca
    - Order Cladocera
  - Class Malacostraca
    - Subclass Phyllocarida
      - Order Leptostraca
    - Subclass Eumalacostraca
      - Order Stomatopoda
      - Order Bathynellacea
      - Order Anaspidacea
      - Order Euphausiacea
      - Order Amphionidacea
      - Order Decapoda
      - Order Mysida
      - Order Lophogastrida
      - Order Cumacea
      - Order Tanaidacea
      - Order Mictacea
      - Order Spelaeogriphacea
      - Order Thermosbaenacea
      - Order Isopoda
      - Order Amphipoda
  - Class Maxillopoda
    - Subclass Thecostraca
      - Order Acrothoracica
      - Order Ascothoracica
      - Order Rhizocephala
      - Order Thoracica
    - Subclass Tantulocarida
      - No order designations
    - Subclass Branchiura
      - Order Arguloida
    - Subclass Mystacocarida
      - No order designations
    - Subclass Copepoda
      - Order Calanoida
      - Order Cyclopoida
      - Order Gelyelloida
      - Order Harpacticoida
      - Order Misophrioida
      - Order Monstrilloida
      - Order Mormonilloida
      - Order Platycopioida
      - Order Siphonostomatoida
    - Subclass Ostracoda
      - Order Myodocopida
      - Order Palaeocopida
      - Order Podocopida
  - Class Pentastomida
    - Order Cephalobaenida
    - Order Porocephalida

==== Subphylum Cheliceriformes ====
- Subphylum Cheliceriformes
  - Class Pycnogonida
    - Order Pantopoda
  - Class Chelicerata
    - Subclass Merostomata
      - Order Xiphosura
    - Subclass Arachnida
      - Order Acari
      - Order Amblypygi
      - Order Araneae
      - Order Opiliones
      - Order Palpigradi
      - Order Pseudoscorpiones
      - Order Ricinulei
      - Order Schizomida
      - Order Scorpionida
      - Order Solpugida
      - Order Uropygi

==== Subphylum Uniramia ====
- Subphylum Uniramia
  - Class Myriapoda
    - Subclass Chilopoda
      - Order Craterostigmomophora
      - Order Geophilomorpha
      - Order Lithobiomorpha
      - Order Scolopendromorpha
      - Order Scutigeromorpha
    - Subclass Diplopoda
      - Order Callipodida
      - Order Chordeumatida
      - Order Glomerida
      - Order Glomeridesmida
      - Order Julida
      - Order Platydesmida
      - Order Polydesmida
      - Order Polyxenida
      - Order Polyzoniida
      - Order Siphoniulida
      - Order Siphonophorida
      - Order Sphaerotheriida
      - Order Spirobolida
      - Order Spirostreptida
      - Order Stemmiulida
    - Subclass Symphyla
      - Order Symphyla
    - Subclass Pauropoda
      - Order Hexamerocerata
      - Order Tetramerocerata

==== Subphylum Hexapoda ====
- Subphylum Hexapoda
  - Class Entognatha
    - Order Protura
    - Order Collembola
    - Order Diplura
  - Class Insecta
    - Order Microcoryphia
    - Order Thysanura
    - Order Ephemeroptera
    - Order Odonata
    - Order Plecoptera
    - Order Blattodea
    - Order Isoptera
    - Order Mantodea
    - Order Grylloblattodea
    - Order Dermaptera
    - Order Orthoptera
    - Order Mantophasmatodea
    - Order Phasmida
    - Order Embioptera
    - Order Zoraptera
    - Order Psocoptera
    - Order Phthiraptera
    - Order Hemiptera
    - Order Thysanoptera
    - Order Megaloptera
    - Order Raphidioptera
    - Order Neuroptera
    - Order Coleoptera
    - Order Strepsiptera
    - Order Siphonaptera
    - Order Diptera
    - Order Trichoptera
    - Order Lepidoptera
    - Order Hymenoptera

=== Phylum Mollusca ===
- Phylum Mollusca
  - Class Aplacophora
    - Order Cavibelonia
    - Order Neomeniomorpha
    - Order Pholidoskepia
  - Class Monoplacophora
    - Order Tryblidioidea
  - Class Polyplacophora
    - Order Acanthochitonida
    - Order Ischnochitonida
    - Order Lepidopleurida
  - Class Gastropoda
    - Subclass Opisthobranchia
      - Order Acochlidioidea
      - Order Anaspidea
      - Order Cephalaspidea
      - Order Gymnosomata
      - Order Notaspidea
      - Order Nudibranchia
      - Order Runcinoidea
      - Order Sacoglossa
      - Order Thecosomata
    - Subclass Pulmonata
      - Order Actophila
      - Order Basommatophora
      - Order Stylommatophora
      - Order Systellommatophora
      - Order Patellogastropoda
      - Superorder Vetigastropoda
        - Order Haliotoidea
        - Order Lepetodriloidea
        - Order Vetigastropoda
        - Order Cocculiniformia
        - Order Neritopsina
        - Order Caenogastropoda
  - Class Bivalvia
    - Order Arcoida
    - Order Hippuritoida
    - Order Limoida
    - Order Myoida
    - Order Mytiloida
    - Order Nuculoida
    - Order Ostreoida
    - Order Pholadomyoida
    - Order Pterioida
    - Order Solemyoida
    - Order Trigonioida
    - Order Unionoida
    - Order Veneroida
  - Class Scaphopoda
    - Order Dentaliida
    - Order Gadilida
  - Class Cephalopoda
    - Order Nautilida
    - Order Octopoda
    - Order Sepioidea
    - Order Spirulida
    - Order Teuthoidea
    - Order Vampyromorphida

=== Phylum Phoronida ===
- Phylum Phoronida
  - No order designations

=== Phylum Ectoprocta ===
- Phylum Ectoprocta
  - Class Phylactolaemata
    - No order designations
  - Class Stenolaemata
    - Order Cyclostomata
  - Class Gymnolaemata
    - Order Cheilostomatida
    - Order Ctenostomata

=== Phylum Brachiopoda ===
- Phylum Brachiopoda
  - Class Inarticulata
    - Order Acrotretida
    - Order Lingulida
  - Class Articulata
    - Order Rhynchonellida
    - Order Terebratulida
    - Order Thecideidina
