= Moby Dick (Rhine) =

Beluga whale, subject of a media sensation in 1966

Moby Dick (Willi de Waal in the Netherlands) was a beluga, or white whale, that caused a sensation in 1966 along the Lower Rhine and then in all of Germany and the Netherlands. It was named after the whale in the 1851 novel Moby-Dick by Herman Melville.

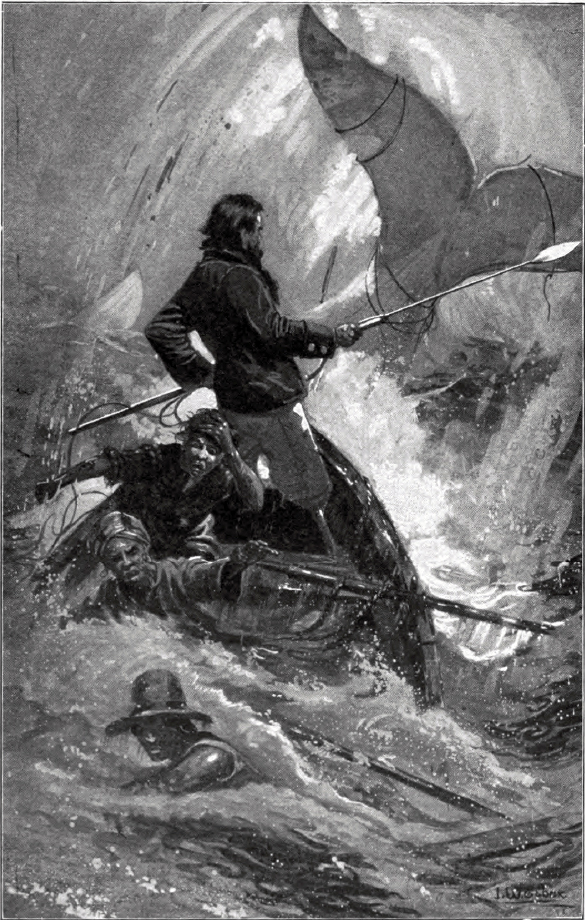
Illustration of Herman Melville's fictional white whale, Moby Dick, the namesake of the Rhine's beluga visitor

On May 18, 1966, a few Rhine skippers near Duisburg reported a white whale in the Rhine to the water police. Officials reacted with incredulity and made the mariners take a blood alcohol test, which came up negative. In fact, there actually was a four-meter-long (13 ft), 1,600-kilogram (3,500 lb) white whale swimming in the Rhine 300 kilometers (190 mi) from the ocean and thousands of kilometers from the natural beluga habitat in arctic waters.

Moby Dick, it was later surmised, had likely been captured on the East Coast of Canada and put on a freighter and sent to a zoo in England. Shortly before landing, a storm in the English channel threw the container with Moby overboard who disappeared, before reappearing months later far up the Rhine river.

Wolfgang Gewalt, the director of the Duisburg Zoo, tried to subdue the whale with nets and tranquilizer darts. This led to massive protests from the people and official protests from the Netherlands so they had to desist.

At first Moby Dick turned oceanward again, but stopped in front of a lock to the ocean opened specially for him, and swam up the Rhine again, as far as Bonn. Once there he turned around and was sighted three days later, on the June 16 at 18:42, for the last time after reaching the open ocean at Hook of Holland.

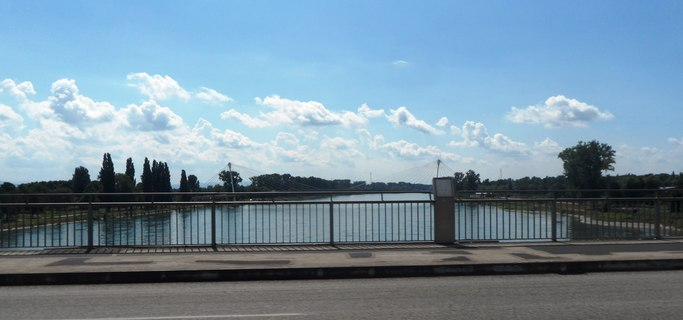
"Moby Dick" found its way to the Rhine River. A belugas' natural habitat is in the Arctic.

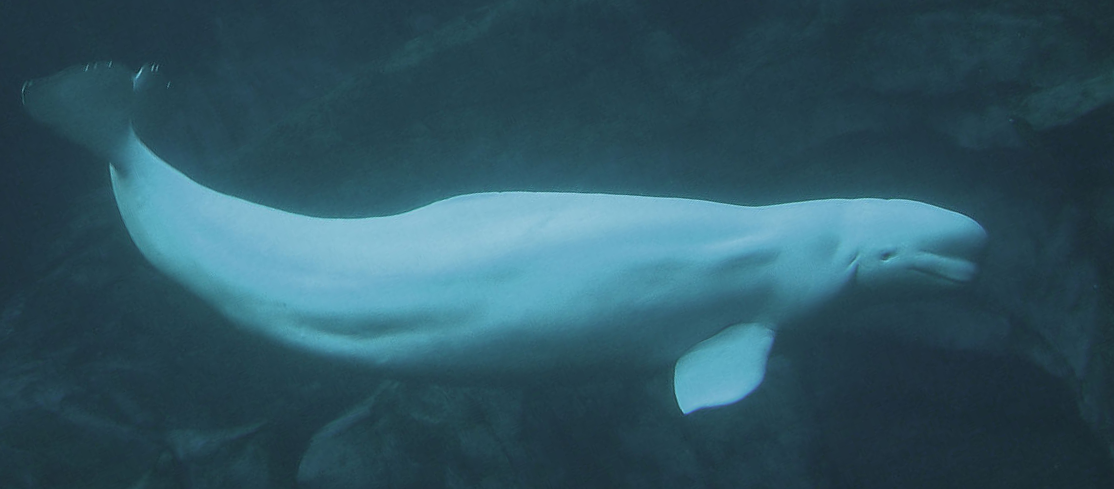
A Beluga whale at the Atlanta aquarium.

Observers noted that the normally white whale's skin appeared bumpy with dark splotches, apparently altered by the polluted waters of the Rhine river. The Rhine was justifiably characterized as a sewer, since waste water from cities and chemical plants was for the most part poured in unfiltered. There is a suggestion that the appearance of Moby Dick in the Rhine and the effect the polluted water seemed to visibly have on the whale was the beginning of the environmental movement in Germany. In fact, around 1966 the first effective environmental protection laws in Germany were adopted.

== See also ==
- List of individual cetaceans
