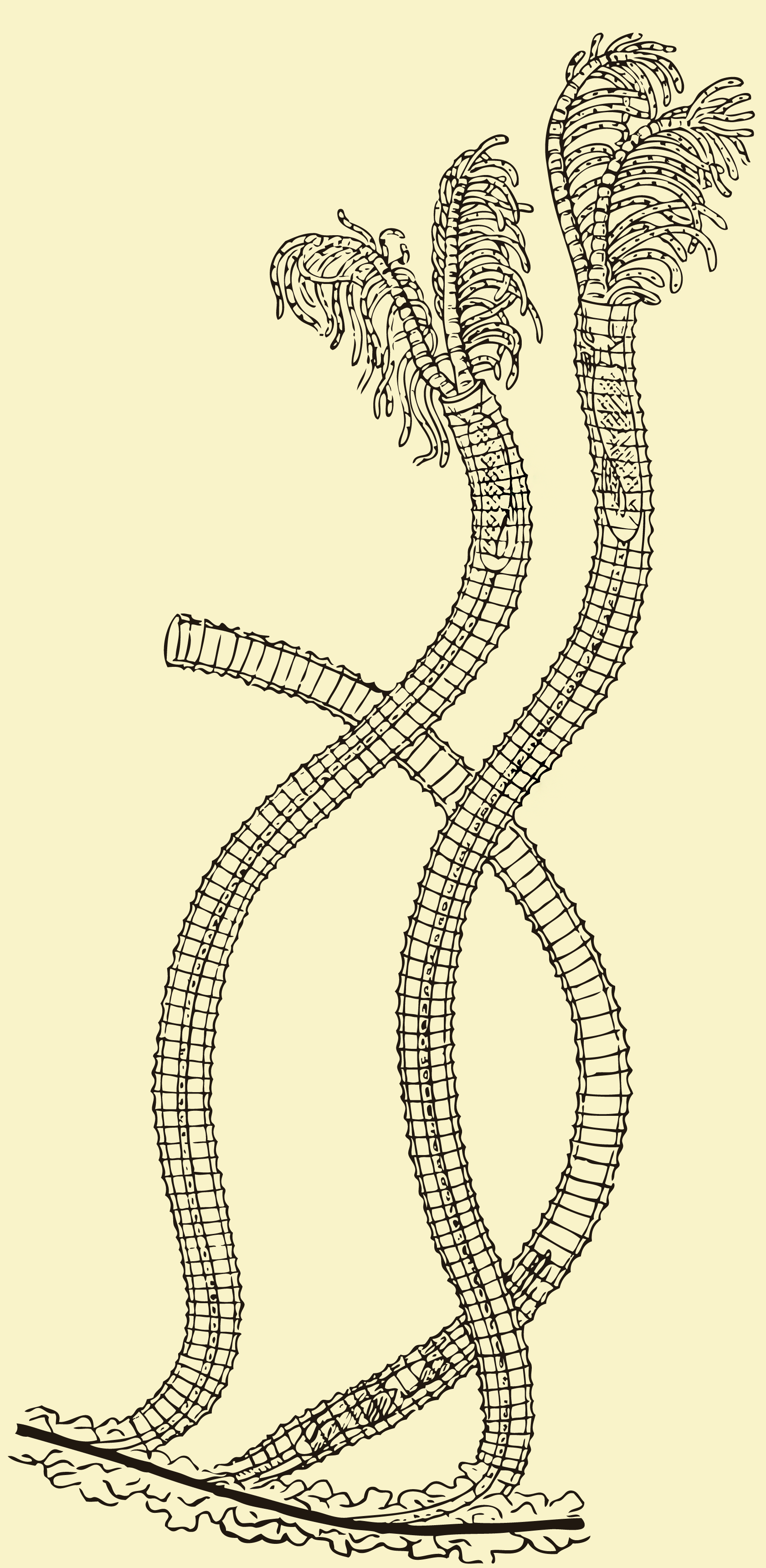

Scientific classification
- Kingdom: Animalia
- Phylum: Hemichordata
- Class: Pterobranchia
- Subclass: Graptolithina
- Order: Rhabdopleurida
- Family: Rhabdopleuridae
- Genus: Rhabdopleura
- Species: R. normani

Binomial name
- Rhabdopleura normani Allman, 1869

Synonyms
- Rhabdopleura mirabilis Sars, 1872

= Rhabdopleura normani =

Species of marine animal

Rhabdopleura normani is a small, marine species of worm-shaped animal known as a pterobranch. It is a sessile suspension feeder, lives in clear water, and secretes tubes on the ocean floor.

== Description ==
This species grows in colonies. Each individual achieves a length of 0.5 mm, with a total colony length of approximately 20 mm.

Located on the tentacles are lateral, frontal, and frontolateral ciliary bands. These are 8-13 μm in length and composed of cilia. In specimens collected in Bermuda, ciliated perforations were found. These ran down the length of the arms, in particular, between the bases of other tentacles laying adjacent.

== Distribution ==
Rhabdopleura normani is widely distributed along the coastlines of the Bering Sea, Norwegian Sea, Atlantic Ocean, and Mediterranean Sea. It has also been found in Bermuda.

Reported locations include:

- North Atlantic basin, including the Norwegian Sea
- North Sea
- Barents Sea
- Greenland Sea
- Labrador Sea
- Bay of Biscay
- Celtic Sea
- Azores
- Bermuda
- South Atlantic, including the Argentine Sea
- Fiji
- Antarctic Ocean

The widespread distribution of Rhabdopleura normani suggests a possible presence of cryptic diversity.

== Habitat ==
This species lives in colonies on the ocean floor. It has been found at depths ranging from 5 m to 896 m, but most commonly occurs between 100 m and 300 m.

== Feeding ==
R. normani uses a local reversal of a ciliary beat to capture food. It is also capable of rejecting unsuitable food particles employing several distinct methods.

== Reproduction ==
Both sexes live together in the colonies. Females have distinctive basally-coiled tubes in which they brood their eggs, each 200 μm in size. As these yolky eggs develop, they cleave radially, and become larvae. These larvae are ciliated, lecithotrophic, and oblong, achieving a length of 400 μm. They can be identified in the following ways:

- They have a yellow coloration, covered with black spots.
- A deep ventral depression is present.
- There is a posterior adhesive organ and an anterior apical sensory organ.
- The epidermis has consistent ciliation.

The ventral depression is actually a glandular epithelium, as opposed to invaginating endoderm. The larval cocoon and adult tube are secreted from this depression.

Inside, the peritoneum of the coelomic cavities starts to disconnect from the main mass of the yolky mesenchyme cells. After breaking free, the larva then swims using its cilia.
