= Rhabdopleura striata =

Scientific classification
- Kingdom: Animalia
- Phylum: Hemichordata
- Class: Pterobranchia
- Subclass: Graptolithina
- Order: Rhabdopleurida
- Family: Rhabdopleuridae
- Genus: Rhabdopleura
- Species: R. striata

Binomial name
- Rhabdopleura striata Schepotieff, 1909

Species of hemichordates in the pterobranchian class

Rhabdopleura striata is a sessile hemichordate. It is a suspension feeder that secretes tubes on the ocean floor.

The zooids are dark brown.

== Distribution ==
Rhabdopleura striata is known only from a single collection from coral reefs off the coast of northern Sri Lanka.
