= Rhabdopleura annulata =

Scientific classification
- Kingdom: Animalia
- Phylum: Hemichordata
- Class: Pterobranchia
- Subclass: Graptolithina
- Order: Rhabdopleurida
- Family: Rhabdopleuridae
- Genus: Rhabdopleura
- Species: R. annulata

Binomial name
- Rhabdopleura annulata Norman, 1921

Species of hemichordates in the pterobranchian class

Rhabdopleura annulata is a sessile hemichordate. It is a suspension feeder that secretes tubes on the ocean floor.

== Distribution ==
It is found in the Indo-Pacific region, off the coasts of Indonesia, South Australia, Tasmania, and New Zealand.
