= Rhabdopleura hollandi =

Rhabdopleura hollandi Temporal range: Llandovery 441 - 435 Ma

Scientific classification
- Kingdom: Animalia
- Phylum: Hemichordata
- Class: Pterobranchia
- Subclass: Graptolithina
- Order: Rhabdopleurida
- Family: Rhabdopleuridae
- Genus: Rhabdopleura
- Species: †R. hollandi

Binomial name
- †Rhabdopleura hollandi Rickards, Chapman, and Temple, 1984

Extinct species of small marine animal

Rhabdopleura hollandi is an extinct marine species of pterobranch hemichordate in the Rhabdopleura genus that lived through the Llandovery Epoch of the Silurian. It was named by Rickards, Chapman, and Temple in 1984.
