= Rhabdopleura recondita =

Scientific classification
- Kingdom: Animalia
- Phylum: Hemichordata
- Class: Pterobranchia
- Subclass: Graptolithina
- Order: Rhabdopleurida
- Family: Rhabdopleuridae
- Genus: Rhabdopleura
- Species: R. recondita

Binomial name
- Rhabdopleura recondita Beli, Cameron and Piraino, 2018

Species of hemichordate in the pterobranchian class

Rhabdopleura recondita is a sessile hemichordate. It is a suspension feeder that secretes tubes on the ocean floor. It is found in the Adriatic and Ionian Seas.

== Distribution ==
Specimens of R. recondita were collected off the coast of Lecce Province in southeastern Italy.

== Bryozoan hosts ==
Beli et al. (2018) found R. recondita living on bryozoan hosts, namely Myriapora truncata, Schizoretepora serratimargo, Celleporina caminata, and Reptadeonella violacea.
