= Colurus =

Colurus may refer to two different genera:

- Colurus, a synonym for Proparachaetopsis, a genus of flies
- Colurus, a synonym for Colurella, a genus of rotifers
