= Grzimek's Animal Life Encyclopedia =

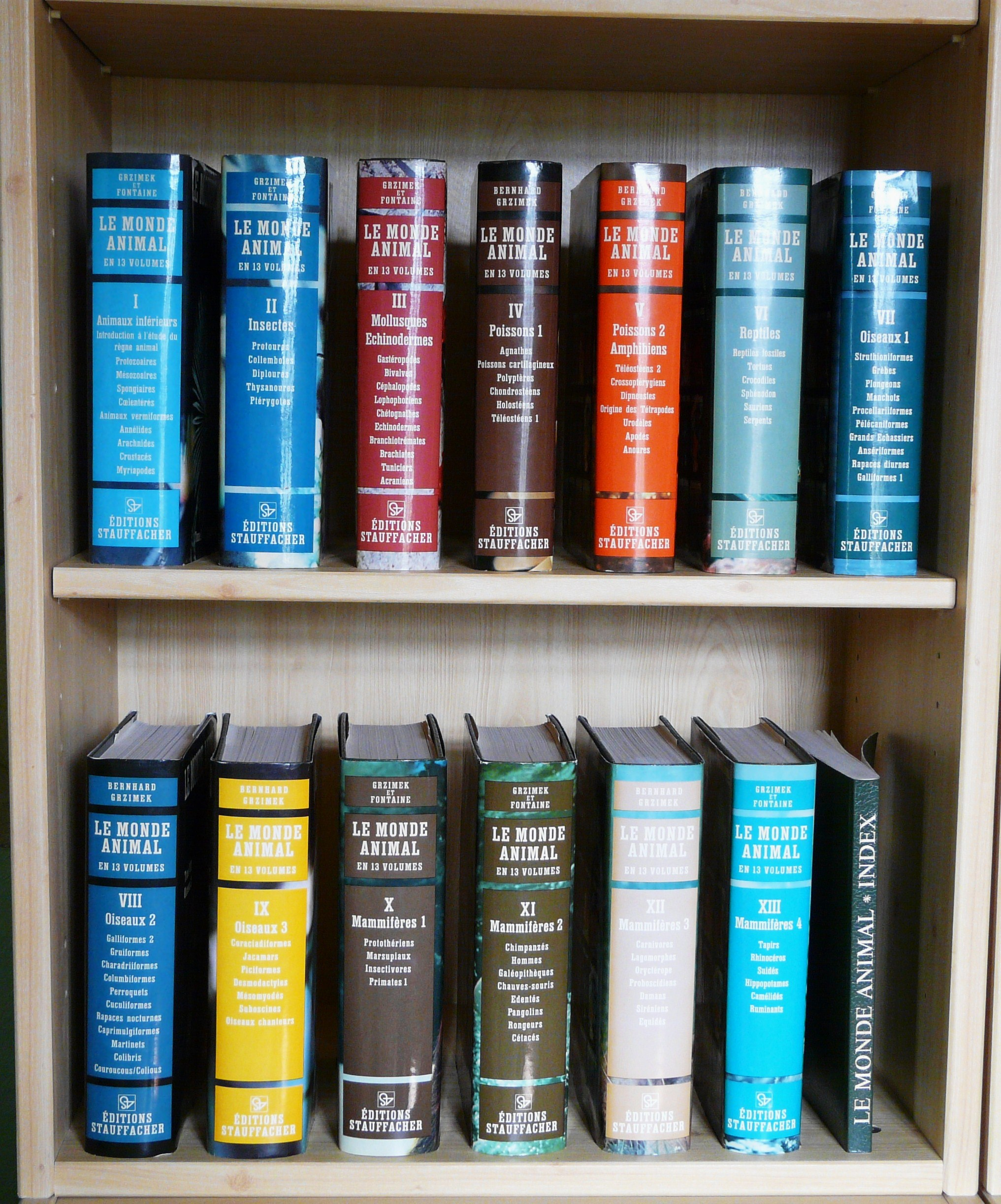
French language edition

Grzimek's Animal Life Encyclopedia is a large comprehensive encyclopedia of animal life. It is named after its original editor in chief, Bernhard Grzimek (pronounced [ˈɡʒɪmɛk]).

Originally the encyclopedia was published as a 13-volume set in German under the name Grzimeks Tierleben (Grzimek's Animal Life) in 1967–1972; it was translated into English in 1972–75. The encyclopedia was an international collaboration by a large number of scientists including Theodor Haltenorth, Wolfgang Gewalt, Heinz-Georg Klös, Konrad Lorenz, Heinz Heck, Lutz Heck, Jean Dorst, Constantine Walter Benson, Irenäus Eibl-Eibesfeldt, Helmut Sick, Heini Hediger, Wolfgang Makatsch, Erich Thenius, Erna Mohr, Adolf Portmann, Nagamichi Kuroda, Lester L. Short, Gerlof Fokko Mees, and Andrew John Berger. It was later extensively updated and republished in a 17-volume second edition under the supervision of Michael Hutchins in 2003. Some university libraries offer access to a digitized version of the second edition. The German edition also published three supplementary volumes: Entwicklungsgeschichte der Lebewesen (History of Life), Verhaltensforschung (Behavioural Research) and Unsere Umwelt als Lebensraum - Ökologie (Our Environment as Living Space - Ecology).

== Online portal ==
In fall 2009, Gale Cengage released a web-based version of the encyclopedia, with access to the web site by subscription. The site allows users to rate articles and to submit videos and photography.

== Volumes for original 1967-1972 Edition ==
- Volume 1: Lower Animals (Protozoa, Sponges, Cnidarians, "Worms", Non-Hexapod Arthropods)
- Volume 2: Insects (Springtails and Relatives, Insects)
- Volume 3: Mollusks and Echinoderms (Mollusks, "Lophophorates", Non-Vertebrate Deuterostomes)
- Volume 4: Fishes 1
- Volume 5: Fishes 2 and Amphibia
- Volume 6: Reptiles
- Volume 7-9: Birds
- Volume 10-13: Mammals

== Volumes for 2003 Edition ==
- Volume 1: Lower Metazoans and Lesser Deuterostomes
- Volume 2: Protostomes
- Volume 3: Insects
- Volume 4-5: Fish
- Volume 6: Amphibians
- Volume 7: Reptiles
- Volume 8-11: Birds
- Volume 12-16: Mammals
- Volume 17: Index

== See also ==
- Brehms Tierleben
- Taxonomy of the animals (Hutchins et al., 2003)
