= Wolfgang Gewalt =

German zoologist

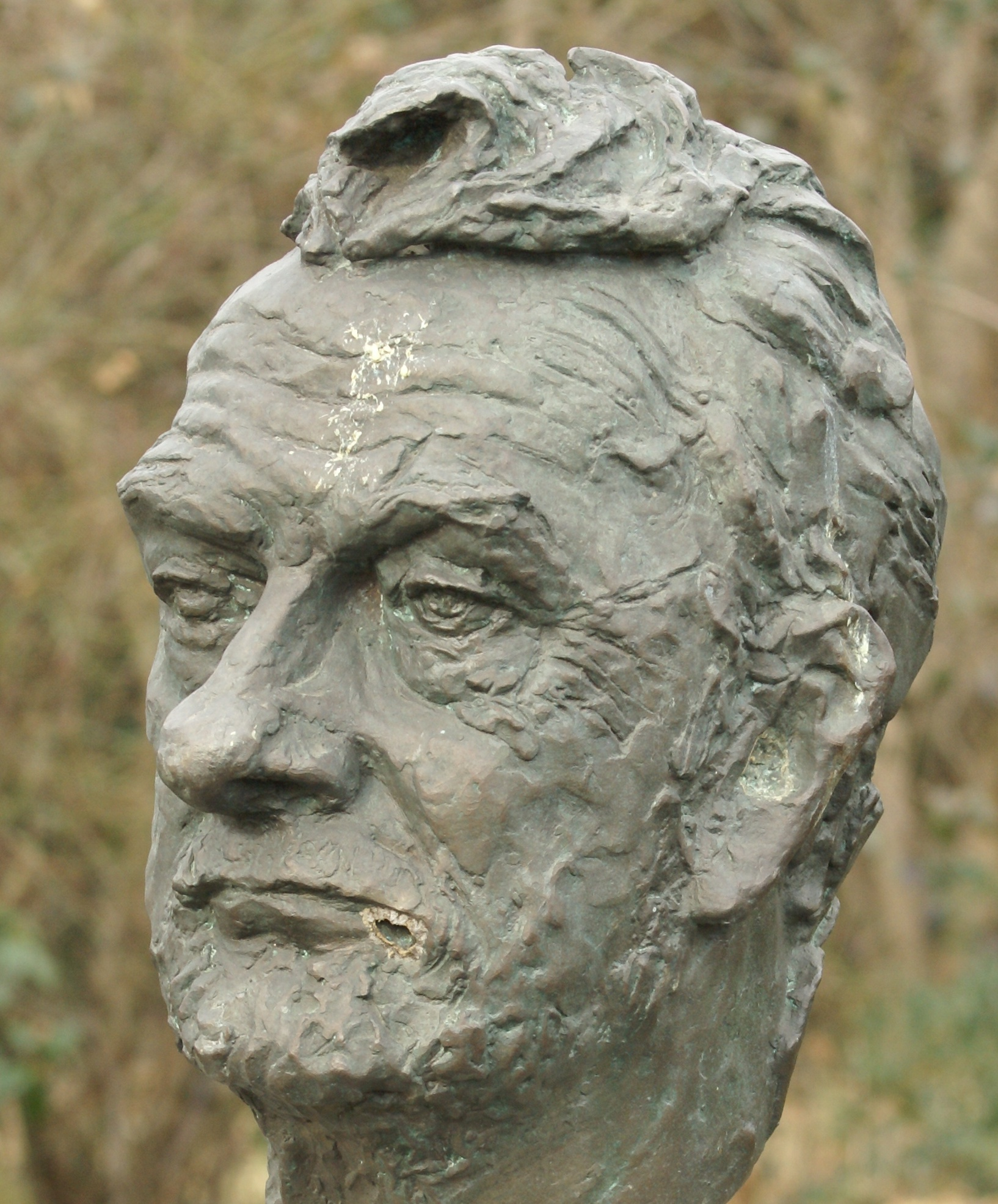
Wolfgang Gewalt

Wolfgang Gewalt (28 October 1928 – 26 April 2007) was a German zoologist, author and former director of the Duisburg Zoo.

== Biography ==
After the study of zoology, botany, chemistry and anthropology, his main focus was research of the great bustard. He recorded his observations in the breeding grounds and his experience with hand bred great bustards in several publications. Moreover, he was chief assistant at the Berlin Zoo. In 1966, he became director of the Duisburg Zoo and landed in the headlines in May 1966 when the white whale Moby Dick strayed into the Rhine. After futile attempts to capture Moby Dick, Wolfgang Gewalt came in for ever more negative criticism. A few newspapers even demanded: "Arrest Wolfgang Gewalt". In June 1966, the whale fortunately succeeded in swimming back to the North Sea. In 1969, Gewalt led an expedition to Canada and brought back the first beluga to Duisburg. For this he reaped angry criticism. In the same year Wolfgang Gewalt participated in the Encyclopedia Grzimeks Tierleben for which he wrote a contribution on Didelphidae. In 1972, he and his colleagues founded the European Association for Aquatic Mammals at the Dolfinarium Harderwijk in the Netherlands. This is a society for the care of aquatic mammals in human custody. In 1975, he brought five Orinoco river dolphins or toninas back to Duisburg from an expedition to Venezuela. In 1978 one of Wolfgang Gewalt's dreams was fulfilled with the birth of the first bottlenose dolphin in a German Zoo. In 1993, Wolfgang Gewalt retired.

On April 26, 2007 he died from the consequences of an accident in his home.

== Selected works ==
- 1954 Die großen Trappen
- 1956 Die Großtrappe
- 1959 Das Eichörnchen
- 1964 Bakala
- 1965 Löwen vor dem zweiten Frühstück
- 1968 Tiere für dich und mich
- 1970 Delphine, meine Freunde
- 1972 Haltung und Zucht von Park- und Ziergeflügel
- 1973 Mein buntes Paradies
- 1976 Der Weißwal
- 1984 50 Jahre Zoo Duisburg
- 1985 Wie machen die das bloss?
- 1986 Auf den Spuren der Wale
- 1993 Wale und Delphine
- 1995 Liebe und Geburt im Zoo, Lübbe, Bergisch Gladbach
