= Ploimida =

Scientific classification
- Domain: Eukaryota
- Kingdom: Animalia
- Phylum: Rotifera
- Class: Monogononta
- Order: Ploimida

Order of rotifers

Ploimida is an order of rotifers belonging to the class Monogononta.

Families:

- Colurellidae Wesenberg-Lund, 1929 accepted as Lepadellidae Harring, 1913
- Lepadellidae
