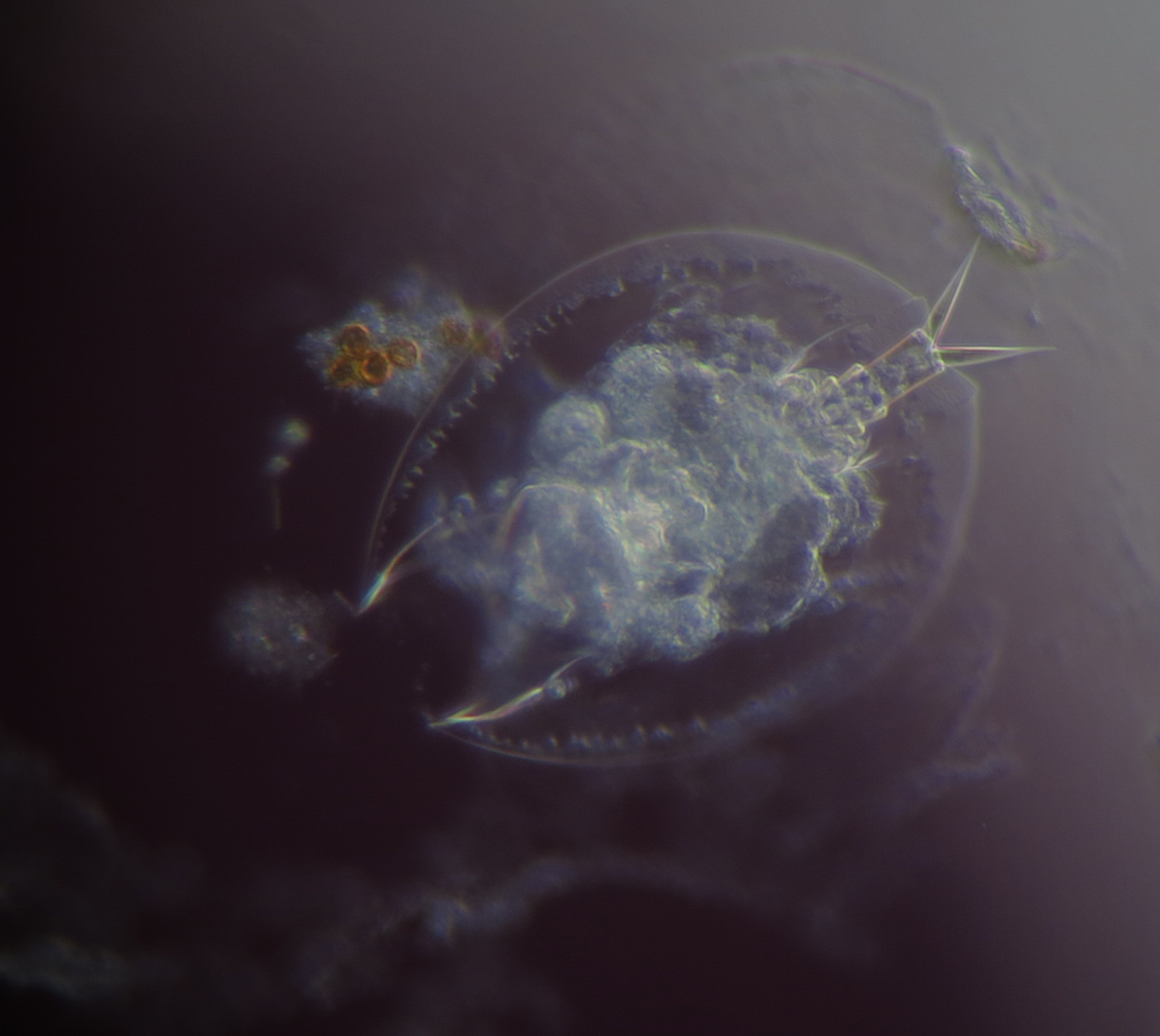

Scientific classification
- Kingdom: Animalia
- Phylum: Rotifera
- Class: Monogononta
- Order: Ploima
- Family: Lepadellidae
- Genus: Lepadella; Bory de St.Vincent, 1826

Synonyms
- List: Squamulella Bory, 1822 (presumed unavailable); Squamella Bory, 1826; Metopidia Ehrenberg, 1830; Notogonia Perty, 1850; Hexastemma Schmarda, 1859; Paralepadella de Ridder, 1966

= Lepadella =

Genus of rotifers

Lepadella is a genus of rotifers belonging to the family Lepadellidae. The genus has a cosmopolitan distribution.

== Species ==
The following species are recognised in the genus Lepadella:

- Lepadella abbei Wulfert, 1956
- Lepadella acuminata (Ehrenberg, 1834)
- Lepadella adjuncta Donner, 1943
- Lepadella akrobeles Myers, 1934
- Lepadella amazonica Segers, 1993
- Lepadella amphitropis Harring, 1916
- Lepadella angusta Berzinš, 1961
- Lepadella apsicora Myers, 1934
- Lepadella apsida Harring, 1916
- Lepadella astacicola Hauer, 1926
- Lepadella benjamini Harring, 1916
- Lepadella berzinsi Segers, 1993
- Lepadella beyensi De Smet, 1994
- Lepadella bicornis Vasisht & Battish, 1971
- Lepadella bidentata Voronkov, 1913
- Lepadella biloba Hauer, 1958
- Lepadella borealis Harring, 1916
- Lepadella branchicola Hauer, 1926
- Lepadella canadaensis Myers, 1936
- Lepadella chengalathi Koste & Shiel, 1980
- Lepadella cornuta Koste & Shiel, 1989
- Lepadella costata Wulfert, 1940
- Lepadella costatoides Segers, 1992
- Lepadella cristata (Rousselet, 1893)
- Lepadella cryphaea Harring, 1916
- Lepadella crytopus Harring
- Lepadella curvicaudata Turner, 1990
- Lepadella cyrtopus Harring, 1914
- Lepadella dactyliseta (Stenroos, 1898)
- Lepadella decora Berzinš, 1982
- Lepadella degreefi De Smet, 1989
- Lepadella deridderae Segers, De Smet & Bonte, 1996
- Lepadella desmeti Segers & Chittapun, 2001
- Lepadella discoidea Segers, 1993
- Lepadella donneri Koste, 1972
- Lepadella dorsalis Rodewald, 1937
- Lepadella duvigneaudi De Ridder, 1968
- Lepadella ehrenbergii (Perty, 1850)
- Lepadella elliptica Wulfert, 1939
- Lepadella elongata Koste, 1992
- Lepadella eurysterna Myers, 1942
- Lepadella evaginata Rodewald, 1935
- Lepadella favorita Klement, 1962
- Lepadella gelida Berzinš, 1976
- Lepadella glossa Wulfert, 1960
- Lepadella hanneloreae Luo & Segers, 2020
- Lepadella haueri Rodewald, 1935
- Lepadella heterodactyla Fadeev, 1925
- Lepadella heterostyla (Murray, 1913)
- Lepadella hyalina Smirnov, 1927
- Lepadella imbricata Harring, 1914
- Lepadella intermedia Dartnall & Hollowday, 1985
- Lepadella jingruae Luo & Segers, 2020
- Lepadella koniari Bartoš, 1955
- Lepadella kostei Wulfert, 1966
- Lepadella lata Wiszniewski, 1939
- Lepadella latusimus (Hilgendorf, 1916)
- Lepadella latusinus (Hilgendorf, 1899)
- Lepadella lindaui Koste, 1981
- Lepadella longiseta Myers, 1934
- Lepadella margalefi De Ridder, 1964
- Lepadella mascarensis Berzinš, 1982
- Lepadella mataca José de Paggi, 2001
- Lepadella mica Zivkovic, 1987
- Lepadella minorui Koste, 1981
- Lepadella minoruoides Koste & Robertson, 1983
- Lepadella minuscula Bartoš, 1955
- Lepadella minuta (Weber & Montet, 1918)
- Lepadella monodactyla Berzinš, 1960
- Lepadella monodi Berzinš, 1959
- Lepadella myersi Edmondson, 1934
- Lepadella nartiangensis Sharma & Sharma, 1987
- Lepadella neboissi Berzinš, 1961
- Lepadella neglecta Segers & Dumont, 1995
- Lepadella nympha Donner, 1943
- Lepadella obtusa Wang, 1961
- Lepadella ovalis (Müller, 1786)
- Lepadella paparoa Berzinš, 1982
- Lepadella parasitica Hauer, 1926
- Lepadella parvula (Bryce, 1893)
- Lepadella patella (Müller, 1773)
- Lepadella pejleri Godske Eriksen, 1969
- Lepadella persimilis
- Lepadella pontica Althaus, 1957
- Lepadella princisi Berzinš, 1943
- Lepadella psammophila Tzschaschel, 1979
- Lepadella pseudoacuminata Sudzuki, 1998
- Lepadella pseudosimilis Koch-Althaus, 1963
- Lepadella pterygoida (Dunlop, 1897)
- Lepadella pterygoides (Dunlop, 1897)
- Lepadella ptilota Berzinš, 1961
- Lepadella pumilo Hauer, 1931
- Lepadella punctata Wulfert, 1939
- Lepadella pyriformis Myers, 1938
- Lepadella quadricarinata (Stenroos, 1898)
- Lepadella quadricurvata Francez & Pourriot, 1984
- Lepadella quinquecostata (Lucks, 1912)
- Lepadella rhodesiana Wulfert, 1965
- Lepadella rhomboides (Gosse, 1886)
- Lepadella rhomboidula (Bryce, 1890)
- Lepadella riedeli De Ridder, 1966
- Lepadella rottenburgi (Lucks, 1912)
- Lepadella sali Berzinš, 1976
- Lepadella salisburii Ahlstrom, 1934
- Lepadella serrata Yamamoto, 1951
- Lepadella strepta Berzinš, 1984
- Lepadella tana Koste & Shiel, 1986
- Lepadella tenella Wulfert, 1942
- Lepadella triba Myers, 1934
- Lepadella tricostata Koste, 1990
- Lepadella triprojectus Sharma, 1978
- Lepadella triptera (Ehrenberg, 1832)
- Lepadella tyleri Koste & Shiel, 1987
- Lepadella vandenbrandei Gillard, 1952
- Lepadella vanoyei De Ridder, 1966
- Lepadella venefica Myers, 1934
- Lepadella visenda Myers, 1934
- Lepadella vitrea (Shephard, 1911)
- Lepadella weijiai Luo & Segers, 2020
- Lepadella whitfordi Ahlstrom, 1938
- Lepadella wilungulai Luo & Segers, 2020
- Lepadella wrighti Koste, 1972
- Lepadella xenica Myers, 1934
- Lepadella yangambi Luo & Segers, 2020
- Lepadella zigzag Segers, 2007
- BOLD:AAL6505 (Lepadella sp.)
- BOLD:AAZ9992 (Lepadella sp.)
