= Wolfgang Makatsch =

German ornithologist and oologist

- Born: 16 February 1906
- Died: 23 February 1983 (aged 77)

Wolfgang Makatsch (16 February 1906 in Zittau – 23 February 1983 in Bautzen) was a German ornithologist and oologist. He wrote numerous books about birds and bird identification. Many of his works were translated into other languages and he contributed to Grzimek's Animal Life Encyclopedia.

== Life and work ==
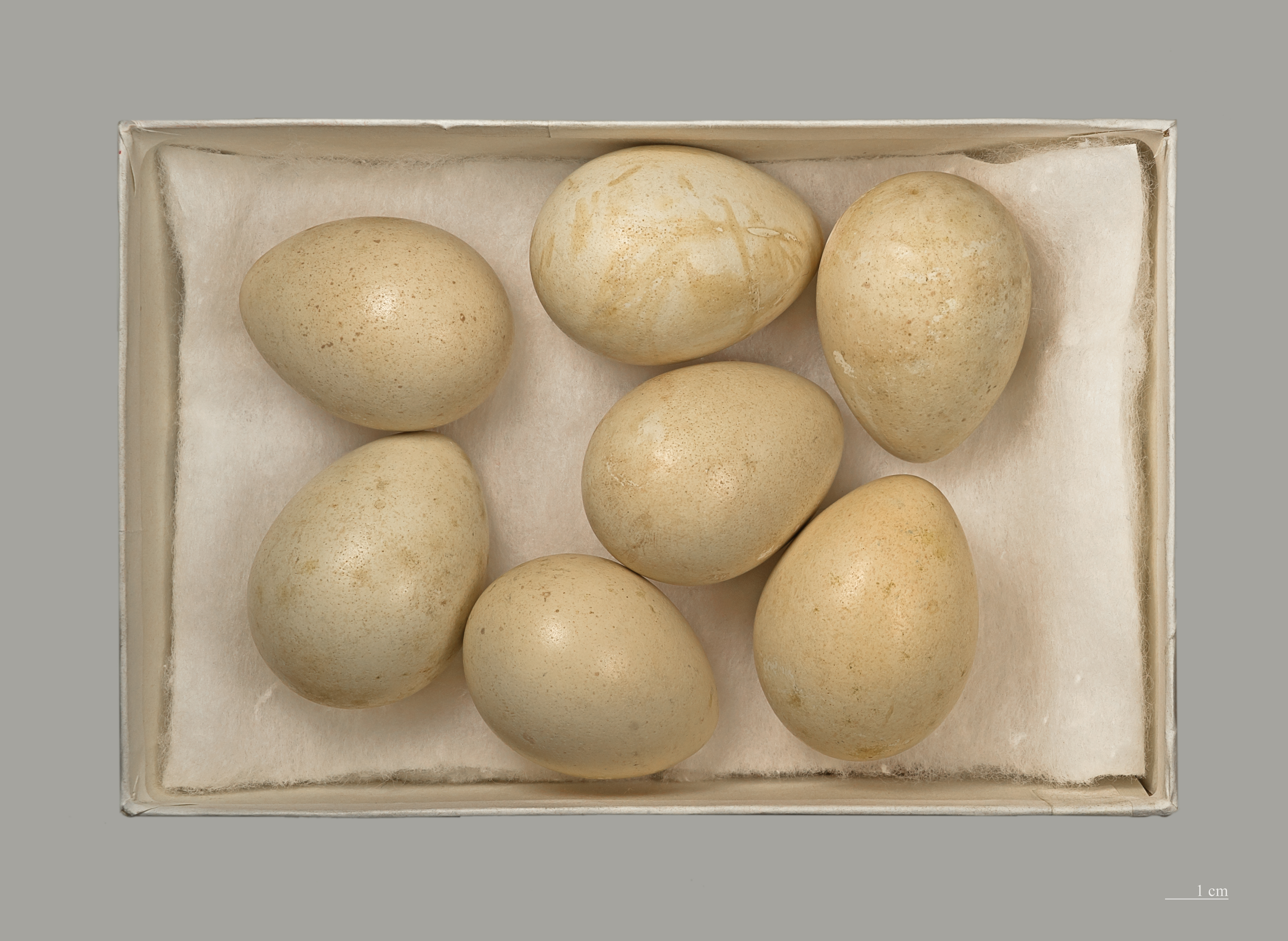
Egg of rock partridge. Collection of Wolfgang Makatsch.

Makatsch was born in Zittau where he was the son of a bank clerk. His interest in birds began at the Zittau park as a child. When the family moved to Bautzen in 1908 his interest in shorebirds increased and he made a collection of eggs while at school. He studied at Leipzig and Munich from 1926 and in 1938 he became an apprentice at Saloniki. During World War II he spent time in the Balkans and was captured by the English in Austria. He returned to Bautzen after the war. In 1951 he received a doctorate for his studies on the birds of Macedonia. He became a staff member at both the Heligoland and Rossitten Bird Observatories. In 1967 he presented in his work Kein Ei gleicht dem anderen, "No egg is like another", the surmise, that the colour white is the colour of the evolutionarily oldest eggs (white is the colour of reptile eggs). Only the need to camouflage the eggs against predators led to a change in colour of the eggs. Wolfgang Makatsch traveled extensively, collecting on his expeditions more than 30,000 eggs. This collection is one of the largest in Germany and currently in the Staatliches Museum für Tierkunde Dresden.

In February 1983 he attended an International Crane Workshop in Bharatpur, India, and was forced to return early after falling ill. He returned to Bautzen (then part of East Germany) where he died.

== Works ==
(selection)

- Unser Kuckuck, ("Our cuckoo"). A. Ziemsen Verlag, Wittenberg, 1949.
- Der Vogel und sein Ei, ("The bird and its egg"). A. Ziemsen Verlag, Wittenberg, 1949.
- Die Vogelwelt Macedoniens, ("The avifauna of Macedonia"). Akademische Verlagsgesellschaft, Leipzig, 1950.
- Die Vögel der Seen und Teiche, ("The birds of lakes and ponds"). Neumann Verlag, Radebeul, 1952.
- Die Vögel in Feld und Flur, ("The birds of fields and meadows"). Neumann Verlag, Radebeul, 1954.
- Die Vögel der Erde. Systematische Übersicht, ("The birds of the world. Systematic review"). Duncker u. Humblot Verlag, Berlin, 1954.
- Die Vögel in Haus, Hof und Garten, ("The birds of the house, yard and garden"). Neumann Verlag, Radebeul, 1957.
- Der Vogel und seine Jungen, ("The bird and its young"). Neue Brehm Bücherei 41, 1959.
- Die Vögel in Wald und Heide, ("The birds in forest and heath"). Neumann Verlag, Radebeul, 1959.
- Die Vögel an Strand und Watt, ("The birds on the beach and coastal strip"). Neumann Verlag, Radebeul, 1962.
- Wir bestimmen die Vögel Europas, ("The identification of the birds of Europe"). Neumann Verlag, Radebeul, 1966.
- Kein Ei gleicht dem anderen. Unterhaltsames und Lehrreiches über die Vögel und ihre Eier, ("No egg is like another. Entertaining and instructive facts about the birds and their eggs"). Neumann Verlag, Radebeul, 1967.
- Die Eier der Vögel Europas. Eine Darstellung der Brutbiologie aller in Europa brütenden Vogelarten, ("The eggs of birds in Europe. An account of the breeding biology of birds breeding in Europe"). 2 Bände (Volumes). Neumann Verlag, Radebeul, 1974.
- Verzeichnis der Vögel der Deutschen Demokratischen Republik, ("List of birds of the German Democratic Republic"). Neumann Verlag, Leipzig, Radebeul, 1981.
