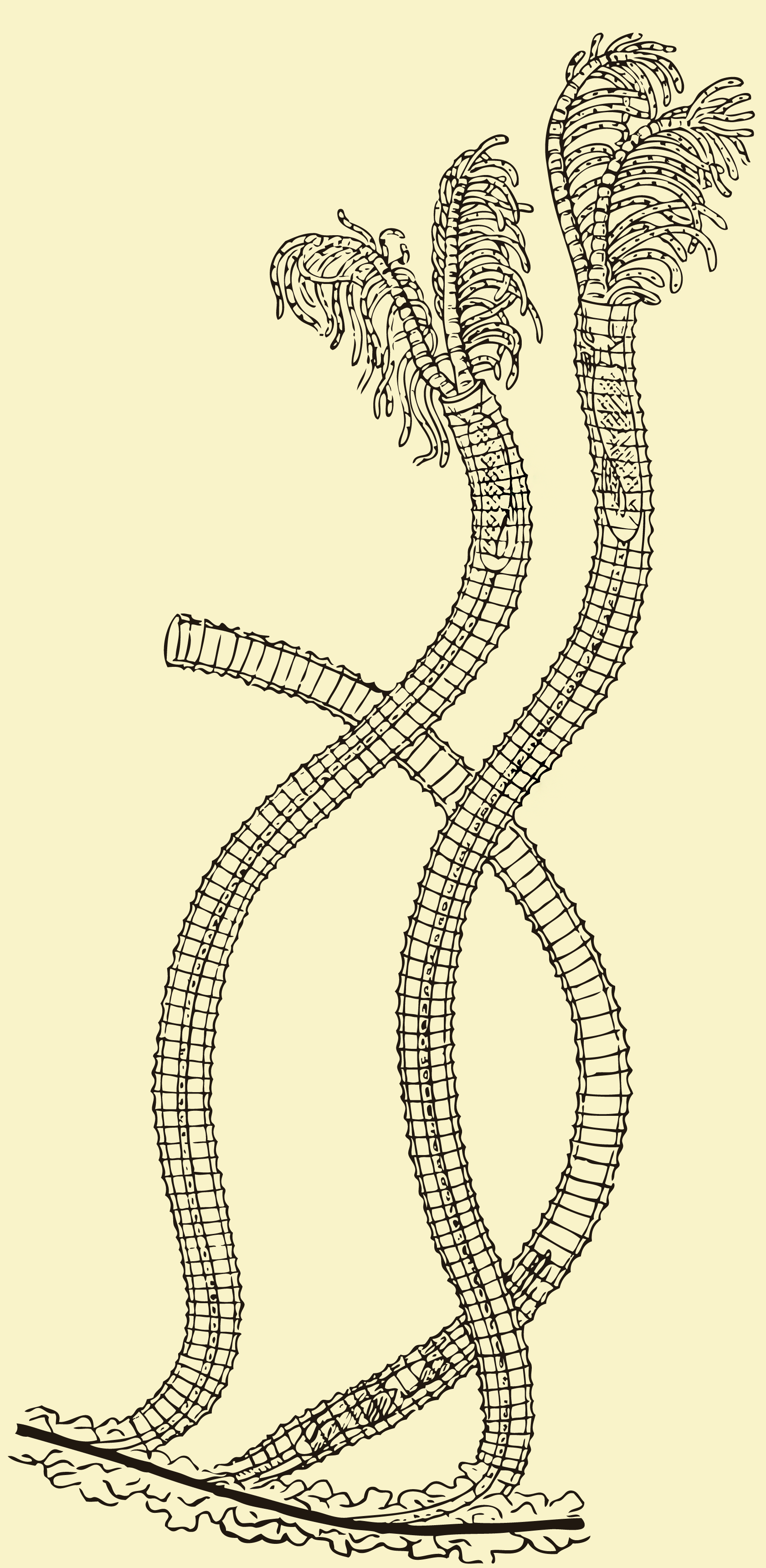
- Rhabdopleura normani Sedgwick

Scientific classification
- Kingdom: Animalia
- Phylum: Hemichordata
- Class: Pterobranchia
- Subclass: Graptolithina
- Order: Rhabdopleurida
- Family: Rhabdopleuridae
- Genus: Rhabdopleura; Allmann in Norman, 1869

Type species
- Rhabdopleura normani Allmann in Norman, 1869

Species
- See text

= Rhabdopleura =

Rhabdopleura Temporal range: Jiangshanian–Recent

Genus of hemichordate graptolite

Rhabdopleura is a genus of colonial sessile hemichordates belonging to the class Pterobranchia. They are exclusively marine, benthic organisms whose species occur within all major oceans and range in habitat from intertidal to c. 900 meters. As one of the oldest living genera with a fossil record dating back to the Late Cambrian, it is also considered to be the only living genus of graptolites.

Rhabdopleura is the best studied pterobranch in developmental biology. Research in the 2010s by Jörg Maletz and other paleontologists and biologists have demonstrated that Rhabdopleura is an extant graptolite.

== History ==
The first evidence for extant species of Rhabdopleura (Rhabdopleura normani) was identified in the Shetland Islands in 1869. Since then, a total of at least nine extant species have been identified.

== Species ==
List of species from WoRMS Editorial Board (2025):

Living species

The genus Rhabdopleura contains at least nine living species.

- Rhabdopleura annulata Norman 1921 — Indo-Pacific region
- Rhabdopleura chathamica Gordon, Quek & Huang 2024 — South Pacific
- Rhabdopleura compacta Hincks 1880 — Atlantic
- Rhabdopleura decipula Gordon, Quek & Huang 2024 — South Pacific
- Rhabdopleura emancipata Gordon, Quek & Huang 2024 — South Pacific
- Rhabdopleura francesca Gordon, Quek & Huang 2024 — South Pacific
- Rhabdopleura normani Allmann, 1869 — Atlantic and parts of the Pacific
- Rhabdopleura recondita Beli, Cameron and Piraino, 2018 — Mediterranean
- Rhabdopleura striata Schepotieff 1909 — Pacific (Sri Lanka)

Nomina dubia (doubtful)

- Rhabdopleura grimaldi Julien 1890 nomen dubium
- Rhabdopleura manubialis Jullien & Calvet 1903 nomen dubium

Extinct species

- †Rhabdopleura delmari Mortelmans 1955
- †Rhabdopleura graysoni Chapman, Durman & Rickards 1995
- †Rhabdopleura hollandi Rickards, Chapman & Temple 1984
- †Rhabdopleura kozlowskii Kulicki 1969
- †Rhabdopleura obuti Durman & Sennikov 1993
- †Rhabdopleura sinica Chapman, Durman & Rickards 1995
- †Rhabdopleura vistulae Kozlowski 1956

== Morphology ==
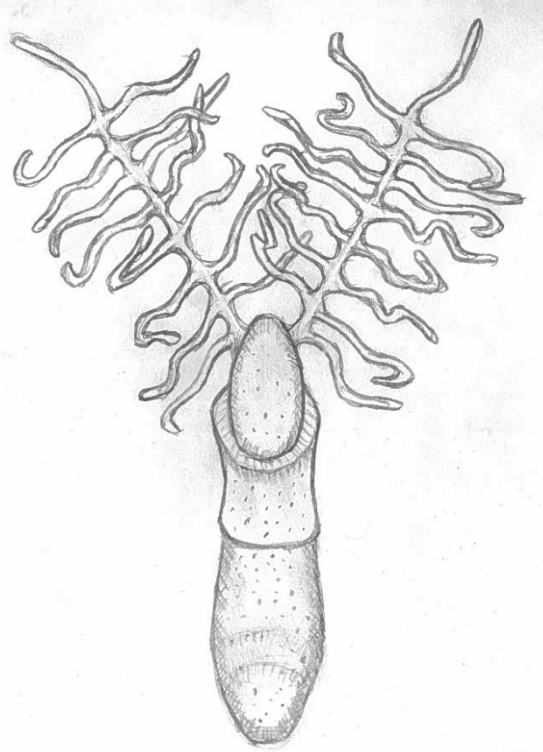
Rhabdopleura Zooid: Sketch based on image from Beli et al. (2018).

Individual Rhabdopleura larvae are lecithotrophic with planula-like features and a uniform arrangement of cilia. Those larva metamorphosize into individual zooids with a bilaterally symmetrical body plan and a single pair of tentacled arms used in feeding. The zooid body is tripartite, being divided into a protostoma, a mesostoma and a metastoma. Generally speaking, the zooids appear to remain integrated with the larger stolon systems of their colonies throughout their lives.

== Colonies ==
Rhabdopleura colonies are thought to begin when an individual larva secretes an initial dome structure known as a prosiculum. Inside the prosiculum, the individual larva then metamorphosizes into a foundational zooid. This zooid emerges from the prosiculum and proceeds to secrete an initial tube. From within this tube, an individual bud forms that produces a second zooid. The second zooid may then produce its own tube, along with a corresponding bud.

The collective aggregation of tubes within the colony is known as a coenicium and the zooids that inhabit it are themselves connected to one another via living tissue referred to as stalks or stolon. Although most species of Rhabdopleura appear to form the prosiculum directly within the water column, one species, Rhabdopleura recondita, is known to form colonies inside the calcareous skeletons of dead bryozoan colonies.

== Feeding ==
Like other pterobranchs, Rhabdopleura are considered ciliary mucus suspension feeders that predominantly consume either suspended particles and/or diatoms. While feeding, individual zooids from a colony project their arms out from openings in the coenicium and proceed to remove particulate matter from the water column.

== Fossil record ==
The fossil record for Rhabdopleura dates back to the Middle Cambrian. There are also Rhabdopleura fossils from the Eocene.
