= Lepadellidae =

- Squatinella sp.

Scientific classification
- Domain: Eukaryota
- Kingdom: Animalia
- Phylum: Rotifera
- Class: Monogononta
- Order: Ploima
- Family: Lepadellidae; Harring, 1913

Synonyms
- Colurellidae

Family of rotifers

Lepadellidae is a family of rotifers belonging to the order Ploima.

== Genera ==
The following genera are recognised in the family Lepadellidae:

- Colurella Bory De St.Vincent, 1824
- Halolepadella De Smet, 2015
- Lepadella Bory de St.Vincent, 1826
- Paracolurella Myers, 1936
- Squatinella Bory de St.Vincent, 1826
- Xenolepadella Hauer, 1926
