= Duisburg Zoo =

Zoo in Duisburg, Germany

Zoo Duisburg
- Interactive map of Zoo Duisburg
- 51°26′07″N 6°48′19″E
- Date opened: 1934
- Location: Mülheimer Straße 273, 47058 Duisburg
- Land area: 15.5 hectares
- No. of animals: ca. 2130
- No. of species: 280
- Major exhibits: Koalas, Fossas
- Website: http://www.zoo-duisburg.de

The Duisburg Zoo, founded on 12 May 1934, is one of the largest zoological gardens in Germany. It is especially well known for its dolphinarium and, since 1994, for breeding koalas.

Far less well known are the breeding successes in other areas, for example, with fossas (carnivorous mammals from Madagascar) and red river hogs.

The zoo is located in the northern part of the Duisburg urban forest on the border with Mülheim on the Ruhr. Federal highway A 3 divides the zoo into western and an eastern parts, which are joined by a leafy country bridge. The highway is scarcely noticeable to the visitors.

== History ==
The Duisburg Zoo was founded in 1934 as the Duisburg-Hamborner Tierpark am Kaiserberg. In 1936, the zoo began to grow from a small animal park with its first (loaned) elephant.

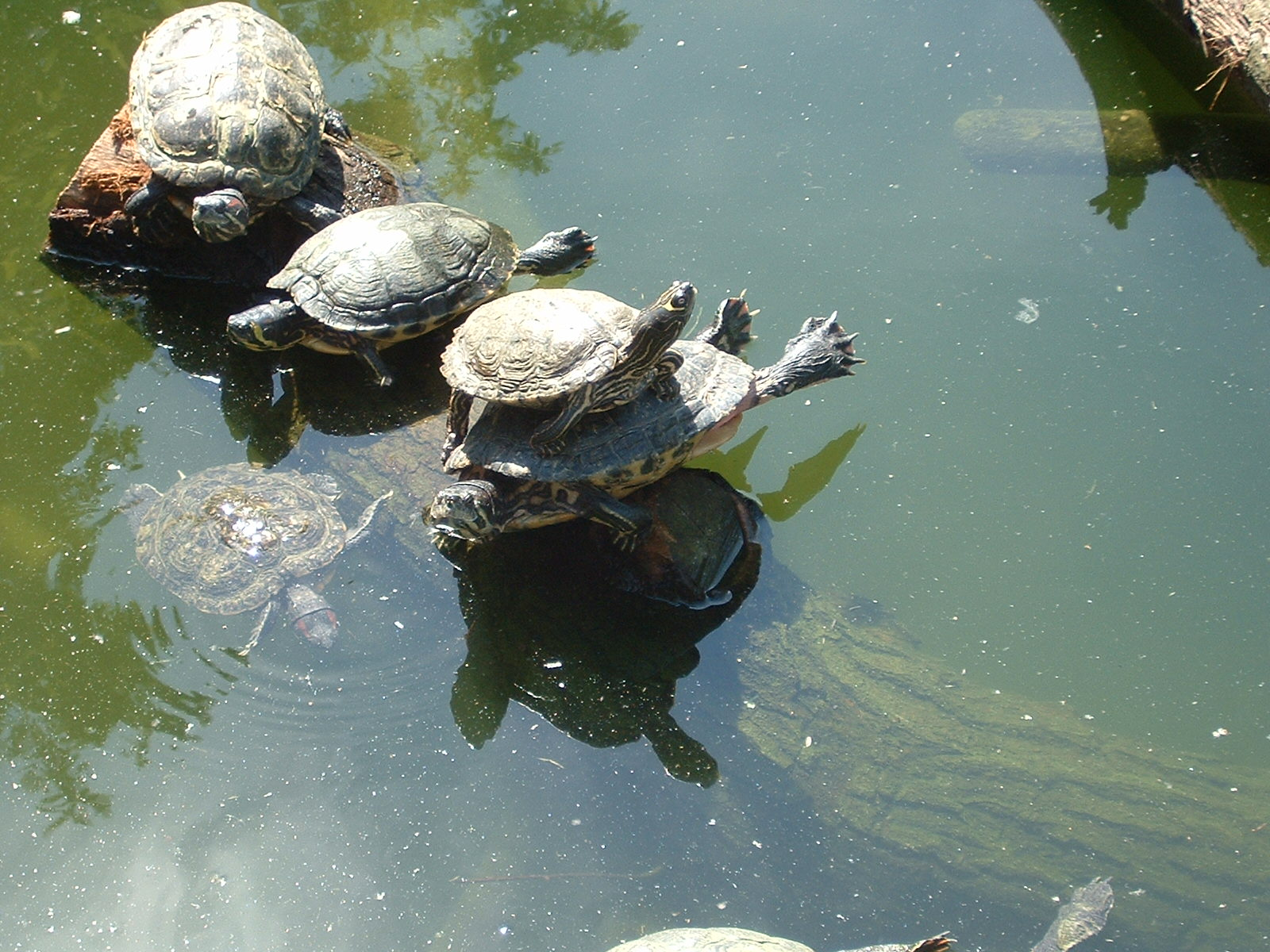
Turtles in the Duisburg Zoo

With the beginning of World War II in 1939, the zoo had to be closed. Only in 1946 was the zoo re-opened with animals loaned from the Hellabrunn Zoo in Munich. In 1952, the zoo could register the acquisition of its first elephant. In 1958, a facility for penguins and seals was dedicated by businessman and promoter Helmut Horten. In 1965, one of Europe's largest dolphinariums was opened in a newly developed area. Research into the behavior of dolphins increased the zoo's prestige, but also drew sharp criticism, since even the generously dimensioned dolphinarium only managed to offer a small fraction of the space available to a dolphin in its natural habitat.

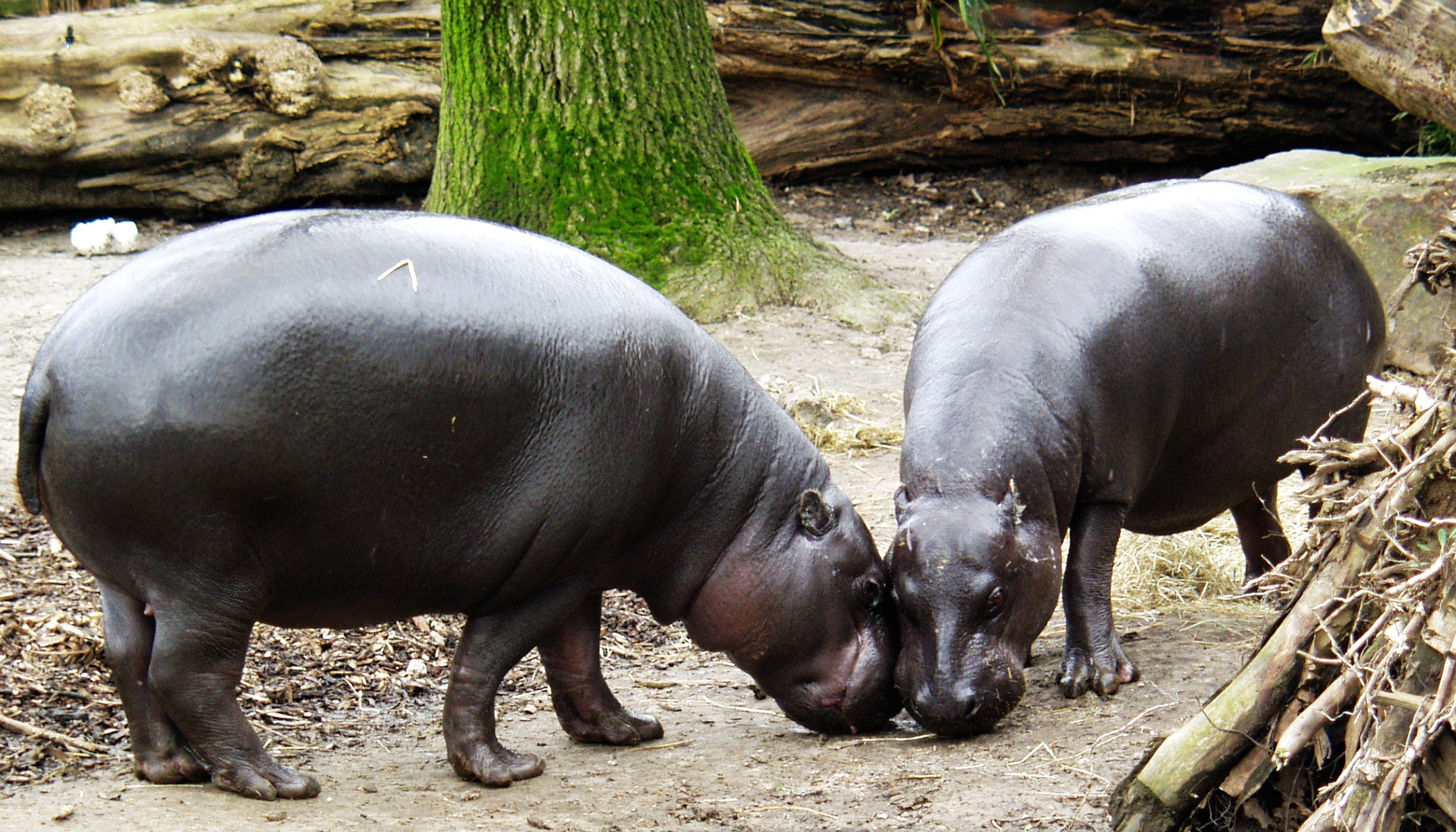
Pygmy hippopotami

Director Wolfgang Gewalt drew similarly vehement criticism for leading an expedition to supply the zoo with a white whale. In the summer of 2004, the beluga Ferdinand and the Commerson's dolphin Yogi, the last animals of their kind in Duisburg, were flown to SeaWorld in San Diego, California, where they are spending their twilight years in species-appropriate tanks with others of their kind. Amazingly, the animals, which are the oldest of their kind known, appear to have tolerated the move well.

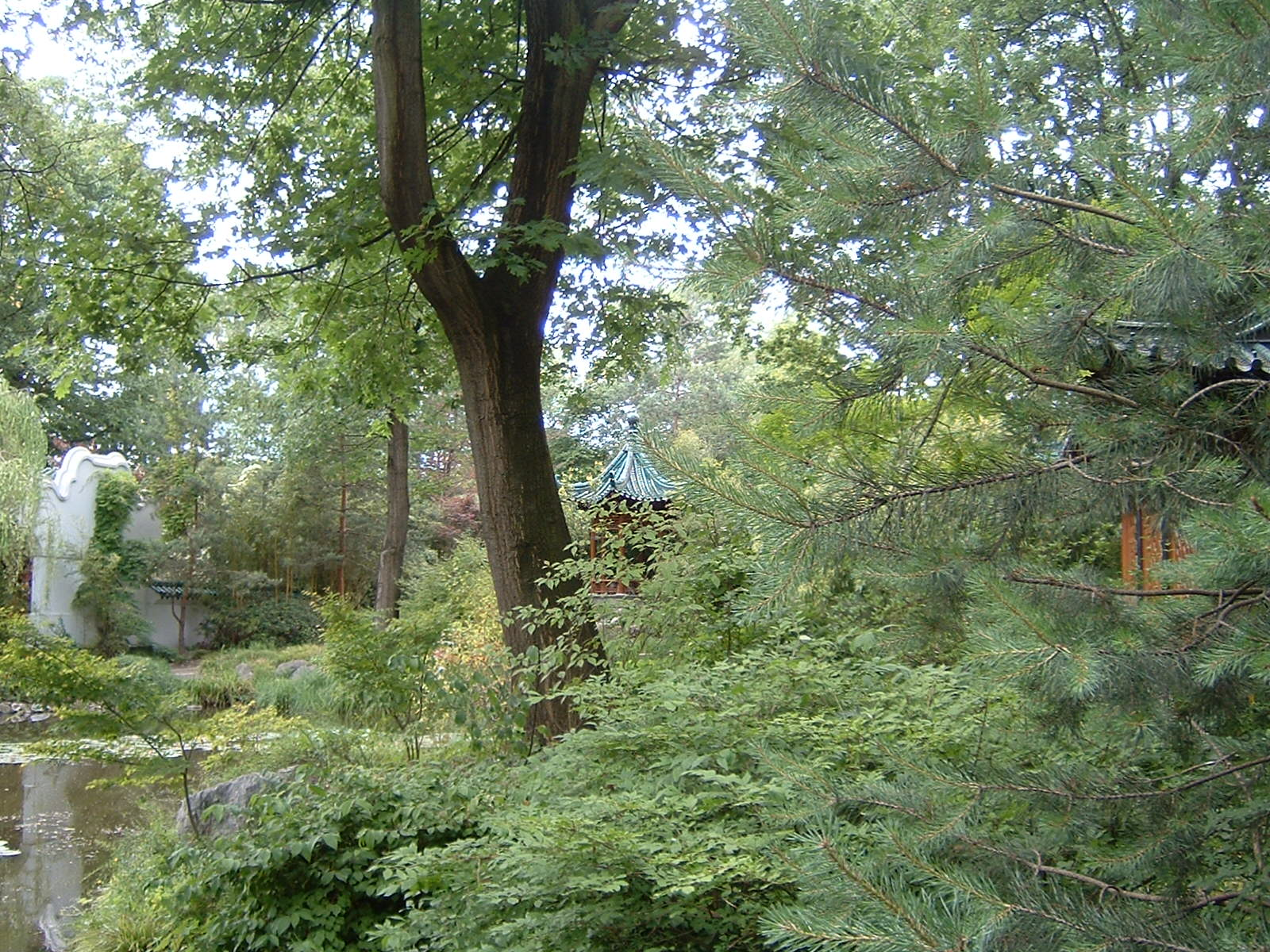
The Chinese Garden in the zoo

In 1970, the animal park renamed itself a "zoo" and marked 1978 with the birth of its first dolphin. Besides the construction of a house for kodiak bears (1982), big cats (1985), koalas (1994) and an outdoor facility for gorillas among other things, a city partnership between Duisburg and Wuhan was dedicated with the construction of a Chinese garden complete with fauna. The Duisburg Zoo celebrated its 70 years of existence in May 2004. In recent years, the zoo made efforts to renovate its antiquated enclosures, which caused many species, for example the polar bears, to be given up; there remain facilities which do not meet contemporary standards. Since September 2005, a new facility for the two river dolphins, dubbed the “Rio Negro”, has opened. One of the dolphins died a short time later; the other one died in December 2020.

== Enclosures ==
=== Dolphinarium ===
The Dolphinarium is inhabited by 7 bottle-nosed dolphins : Ivo (M), Pepina (F), Delphi (F), Daisy (F), Dörte (F), Debbie (F) and Dobbie (M). They live in a pool containing about 3 million liters of seawater. It is not cleaned chemically, but with special equipment using air. It is the largest dolphinarium in Germany. Depending on the season, two or three performances take place every day in the large arena. During the week, the dolphinarium is free-of-charge for visitors between performances (but not on Sundays or bank holidays). It regularly offers special treats, such as "An Evening with the Dolphins" or "Zookeeper for a Day" and weddings or children's birthday parties can be celebrated there. Dolphins have been born and bred in Duisburg several times: Duphi (1988; since died), Delphi (1992), Daisy (1996), Duke (2001; since died) and Dolly (2007, the daughter of Delphi). However, on several occasions the offspring did not reach maturity. In September 2007, Donna, the daughter of Pepina, was born, and she has been on show to visitors since 27 February 2008.

The park previously held two amazon river dolphins, the last of which died December 2020.

=== Rio Negro ===
The Rio Negro was opened in 2005, and is situated in the Tropical House. In a large pool lived the Amazon river dolphin Baby - which was the only of its kind in Europe. The pool was constructed to look almost natural, and is separated from the viewing area by a curved, meter-high glass plate. The house is decked out naturally with wooden flooring, much foliage, and uncaged animals. Previously, another dolphin Apure also lived here; at the time of his death in 2006, he was the oldest known Amazon dolphin in the world, being at least 45 years old, but died in December 2020. The pool was not intended to be exclusively used for the Amazon river dolphin - the plans are that it will be used in the future by other species after Baby's death.

=== Koala House ===
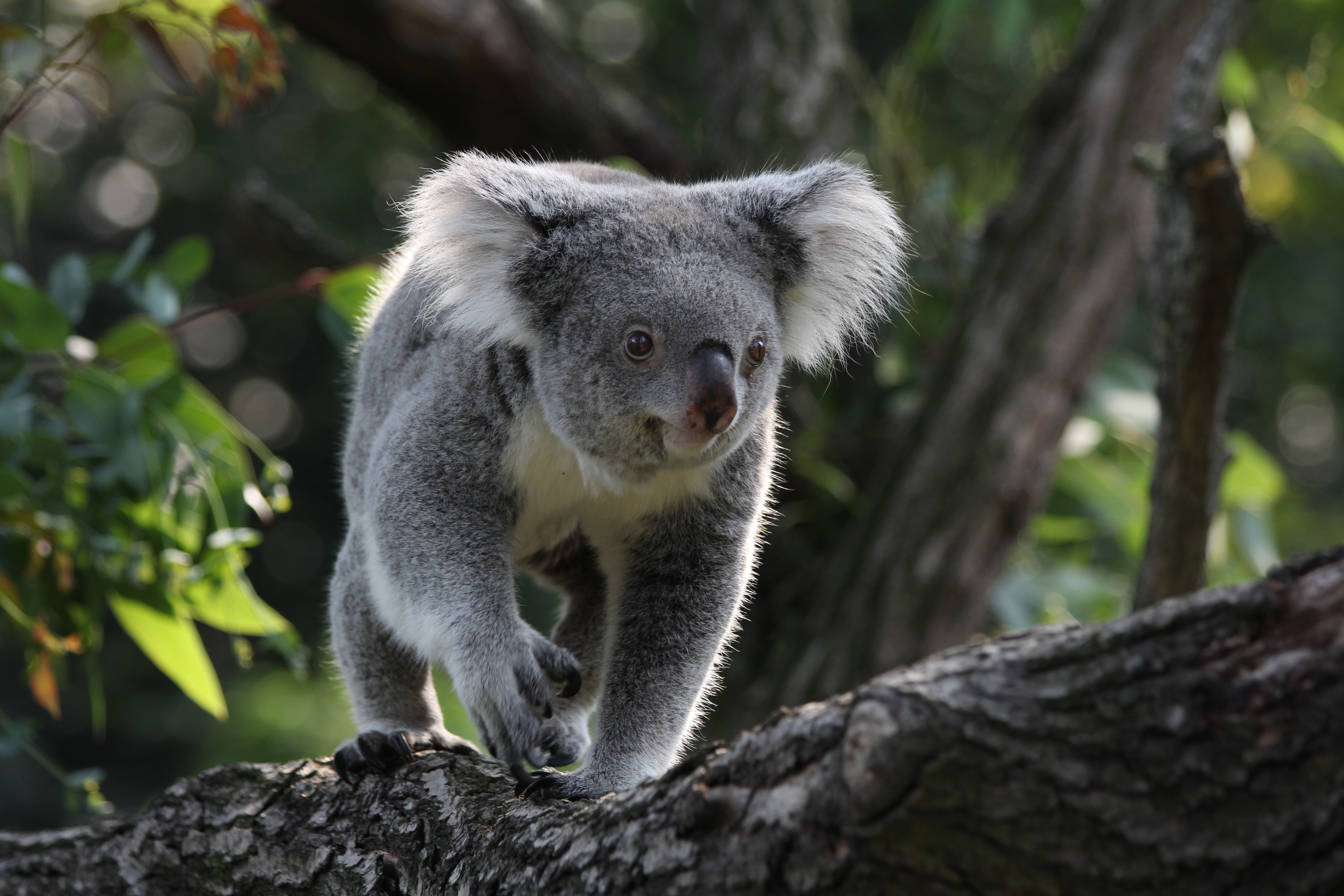
Koala in Duisburg Zoo in 2019

In the Koala House, glass-fronted area houses these small Australian animals. The koalas are only separated from the visitors by this glass plate. Additionally, general information on koalas and Australia, as well as the story of how the koalas came to be in the zoo, is available. A long-term exhibition of pictures by nature photographer Ingo Öland is also on view, showing the landscape of Australia and its animals in 22 large-format pictures.

=== Fossa Enclosure ===
The Fossa Enclosure is laid out to imitate the natural habitat of the fossa, with much foliage and several small pools. The breeding program is the largest worldwide, and since 1994, the zoo has coordinated the European preservation program for this species. The enclosure was financed and donated by the Association of Duisburg Zoo Friends (Verein der Duisburger Zoofreunde) in 2000.

=== Equatorium ===
The Equatorium is the largest section of Duisburg Zoo. It derives its name for housing animals usually found in the rainforests of the equatorial regions, and primarily houses primates. A few years ago, the installation was redesigned and renovated piece-by-piece. In 2002, the Gorilla-Bush, was opened, a large open enclosure for lowland gorillas and De Brazza's monkeys. In the autumn of 2005, the new East entrance opened, behind which one can view the mountain loris in a 'walk-through' enclosure. Visitors can feed these animals daily. Next to the loris enclosure, colobus monkeys also inhabit a natural-looking enclosure donated by Thyssen. Other animals in this section include orangutans, macaques, gibbons, sloths, and pygmy hippos.

=== Outdoor Tortoise Enclosure ===
In 2006, the Outdoor Tortoise Enclosure was laid out. It is meant to imitate the animals' natural habitat, with many stony burrows for the tortoises to retreat into and foliage in the enclosure for the tortoises to consume. Within the enclosure, there is also a small stream and 'warming shelters': Plexiglass containers into which the tortoises can go to warm themselves up. Previously, the tortoises were housed in the same building as the aquarium, where they had a large enclosure strewn with sand and into which warming lamps were placed.

== Ruhrpott-Schnauzen ==
Everyday life at the Duisburg Zoo can be followed daily on ZDF. This TV channel has broadcast the documentary series Ruhrpott-Schnauzen since June 2006.

The last program so far was broadcast on 8 July 2008, and was succeeded from October 2008 by a new program Tierische Kumpel, which relates stories from not just Duisburg but also ZOOM Erlebniswelt in Gelsenkirchen and the Aquazoo Düsseldorf).
