= Colurella =

- Colurella uncinata

Scientific classification
- Domain: Eukaryota
- Kingdom: Animalia
- Phylum: Rotifera
- Class: Monogononta
- Order: Ploima
- Family: Lepadellidae
- Genus: Colurella; Bory de St.Vincent, 1823

Synonyms
- List: Calurella Hofsten, 1909; Colurus Ehrenberg, 1830; Lycocephalus Corda, 1838; Monura Ehrenberg, 1830

Genus of rotifers

Colurella is a genus of rotifers belonging to the family Lepadellidae. The genus has a cosmopolitan distribution.

== Species ==
The following species are recognised in the genus Colurella:

- Colurella adriatica Ehrenberg, 1831
- Colurella anodonta Carlin, 1939
- Colurella aquaducti Torok, 1956
- Colurella aquaeducti Török, 1956
- Colurella asymmetrica Luo & Segers, 2020
- Colurella collaris Wulfert, 1965
- Colurella colurus (Ehrenberg, 1830)
- Colurella denticauda Carlin, 1939
- Colurella dicentra (Gosse, 1887)
- Colurella geophila Donner, 1951
- Colurella halophila Wulfert, 1942
- Colurella hindenburgi Steinecke, 1916
- Colurella marinovi Althaus, 1957
- Colurella mucronulata Ahlstrom, 1938
- Colurella oblonga Donner, 1943
- Colurella obtusa (Gosse, 1886)
- Colurella ovalis Wei, Jersabek, Xu & Yang, 2019
- Colurella oxycauda Carlin, 1939
- Colurella paludosa Carlin, 1939
- Colurella psammophila Segers & Chittapun, 2001
- Colurella salina Althaus, 1957
- Colurella sanoamuangae Chittapun, Pholpunthin & Segers, 1999
- Colurella sinistra Carlin, 1939
- Colurella sulcata (Stenroos, 1898)
- Colurella tesselata (Glascott, 1893)
- Colurella uncinata (Müller, 1773)
- Colurella unicauda Godske Eriksen, 1968
- Colurella unicaudata Godske Eriksen, 1968
