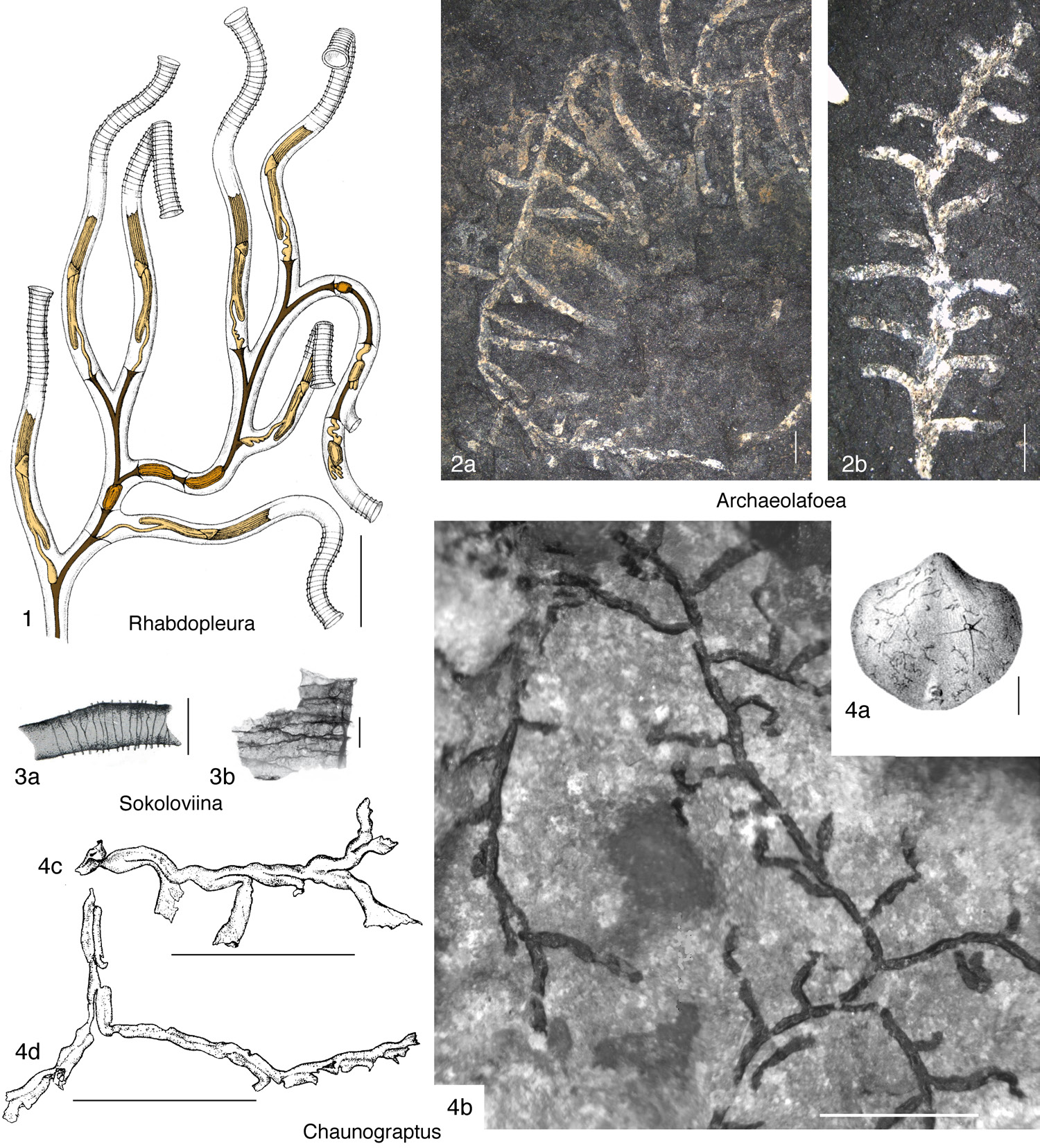

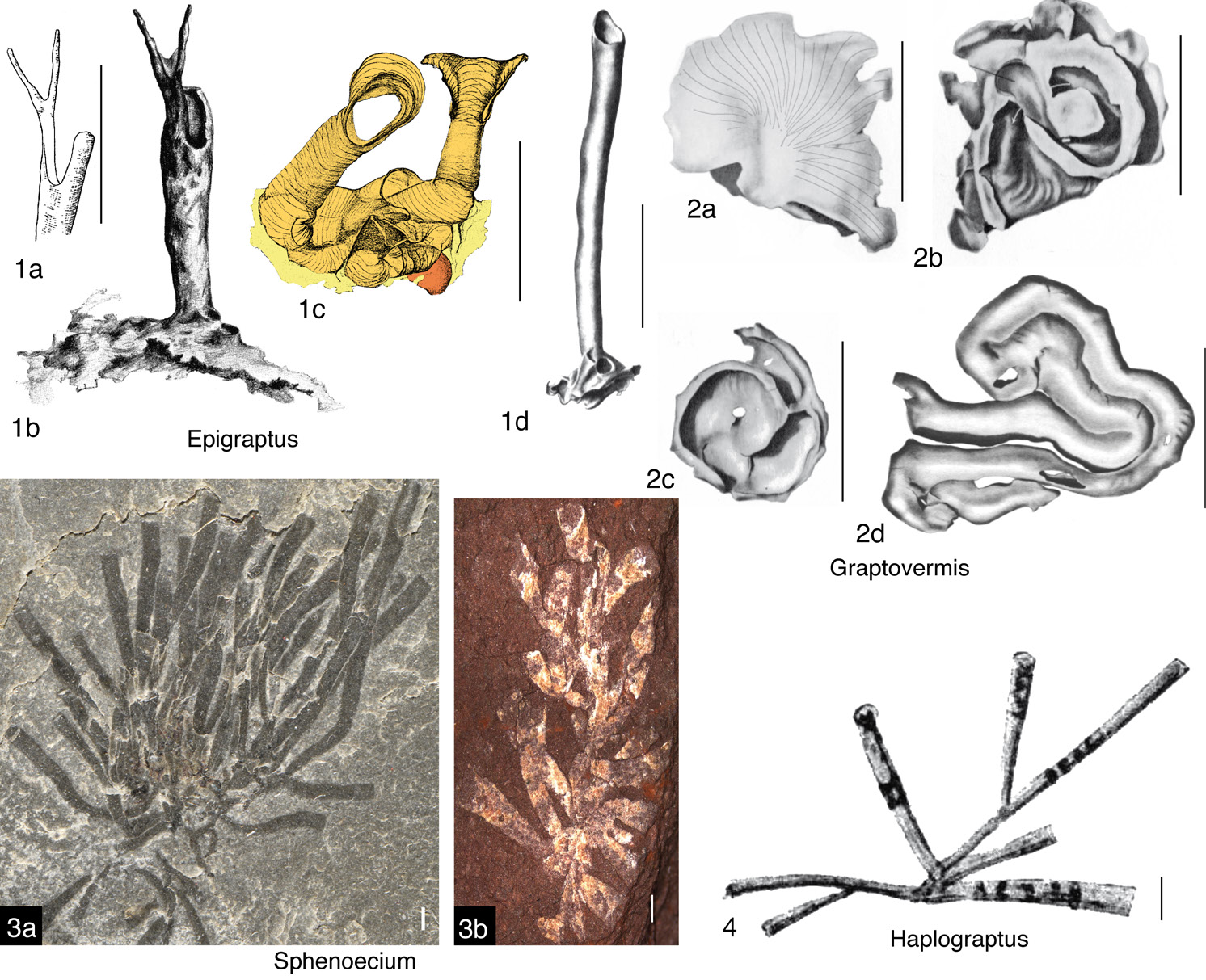
- Various members of Rhabdopleuridae

Scientific classification
- Kingdom: Animalia
- Phylum: Hemichordata
- Class: Pterobranchia
- Subclass: Graptolithina
- Order: Rhabdopleurida; Fowler, 1892
- Family: Rhabdopleuridae; Harmer, 1905

Genera
- See genera

Synonyms
- Order; Stolonoidea Kozlowski, 1938; Family; Graptovermidae Kozlowski, 1949; Idiotubidae Kozlowski, 1949; Rhabdopleuritidae Mierzejewski, 1986; Rhabdopleuroididae Mierzejewski, 1986; Stolonodendridae Bulman, 1955

= Rhabdopleurida =

Rhabdopleurida Temporal range: Cambrian (Fortunian)–Present

Order of hemichordates in the pterobranchian class

Rhabdopleurida is one of three orders in the class Pterobranchia, which are small, worm-shaped animals, and the only surviving graptolites. Members belong to the hemichordates. Species in this order are sessile, colonial, connected with a stolon, living in clear water and secrete tubes called tubarium. They have a single gonad, the gill slits are absent and the collar has two tentaculated arms. Rhabdopleura is the best studied pterobranch in developmental biology.

== Genera ==
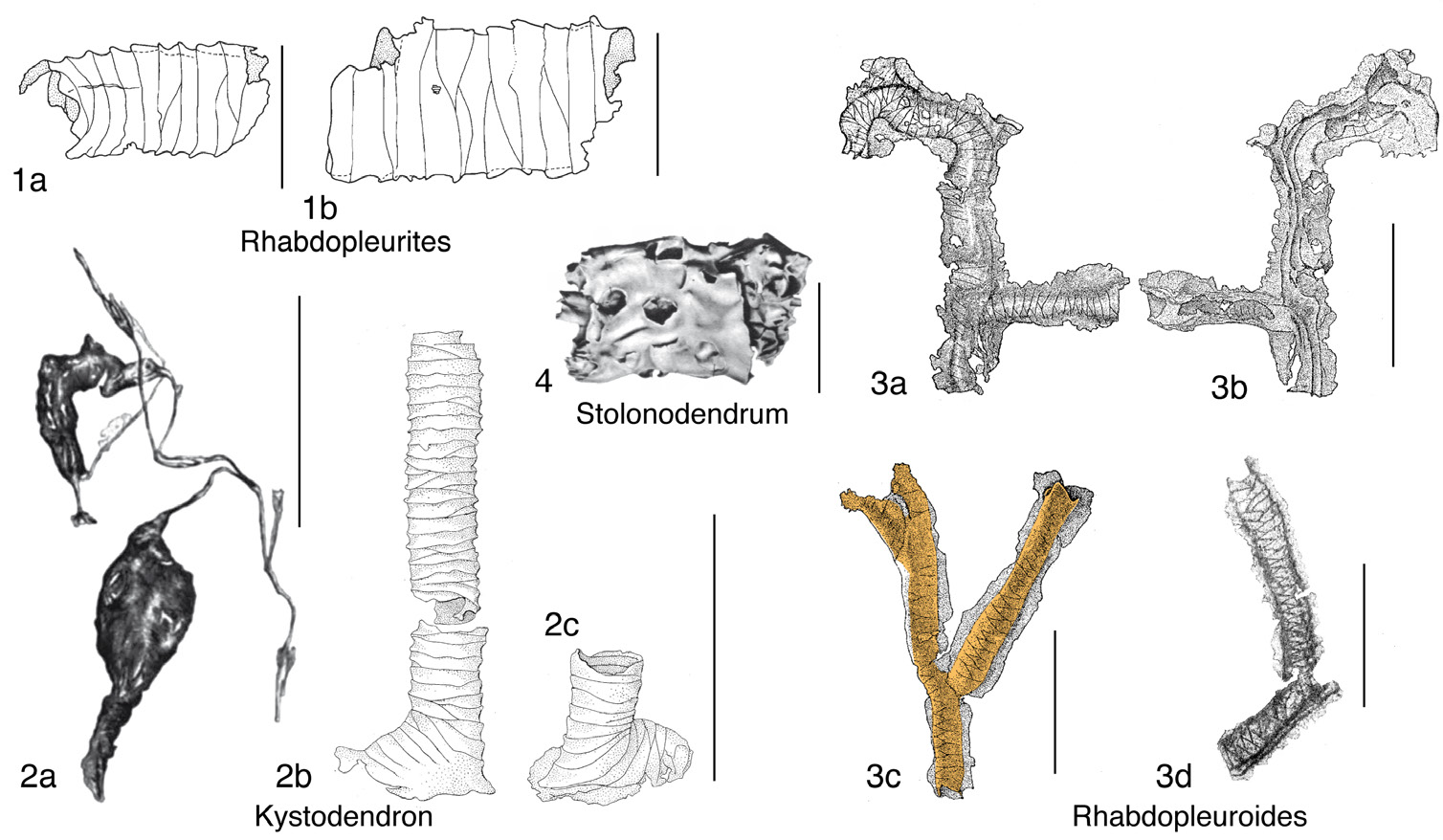
Various members of Rhabdopleuridae

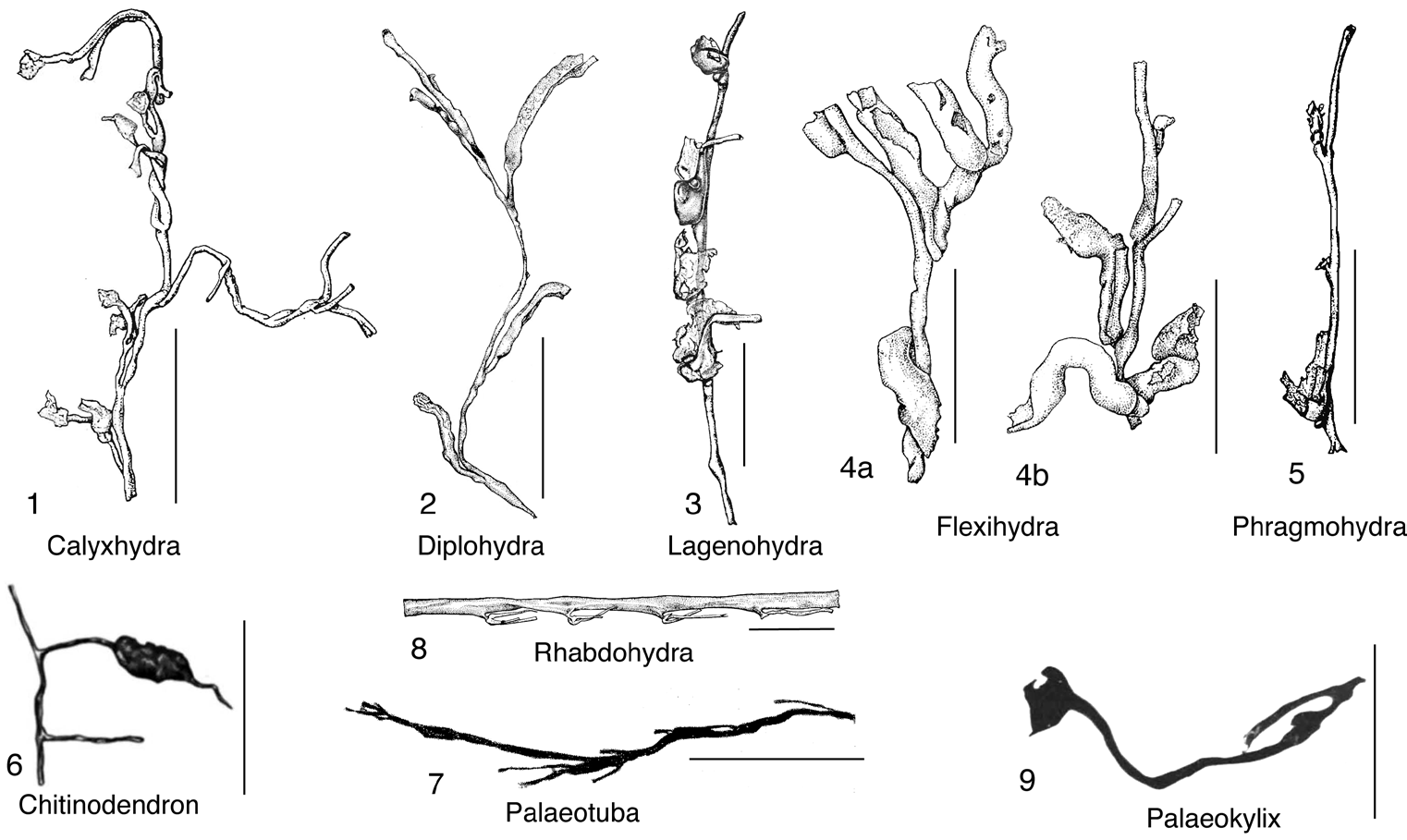
Taxa interpreted as rhabdopleurid stolons

The family contains a single extant genus, Rhabdopleura. Based on Maletz and Beli (2018), the following genera are recognised in the family Rhabdopleuridae:

Order Rhabdopleurida Fowler, 1892

- Family Rhabdopleuridae Harmer, 1905
  - Genus Rhabdopleura Allman in Norman, 1869
  - Genus †Archaeolafoea Chapman, 1919
  - Genus †Chaunograptus Hall, 1882
  - Genus †Sokoloviina Kirjanov, 1968
  - Genus †Epigraptus Eisenack, 1941
  - Genus †Graptovermis Kozłowski, 1949
  - Genus †Haplograptus Ruedemann, 1933
  - Genus †Kystodendron Kozłowski, 1959
  - Genus †Rhabdopleurites Kozłowski, 1967
  - Genus †Rhabdopleuroides Kozłowski, 1961
  - Genus †Sphenoecium Chapman & Thomas, 1936
  - Genus †Stolonodendrum Kozłowski, 1949

Genera interpreted as possible stolons of members of Rhabdopleuridae:

- Genus †Calyxhydra Kozłowski, 1959
- Genus †Chitinodendron Eisenack, 1937
- Genus †Diplohydra Kozłowski, 1959
- Genus †Flexihydra Kozłowski, 1959
- Genus †Lagenohydra Kozłowski, 1959
- Genus †Palaeokylix Eisenack, 1932
- Genus †Palaeotuba Eisenack, 1934
- Genus †Phragmohydra Kozłowski, 1959
- Genus †Rhabdohydra Kozłowski, 1959
