= Outline of zoology =

Overview of and topical guide to zoology

The following outline is provided as an overview of and topical guide to zoology:

Zoology – study of animals. Zoology, or "animal biology", is the branch of biology that relates to the animal kingdom, including the identification, structure, embryology, evolution, classification, habits, and distribution of all animals, both living and extinct, and how they interact with their ecosystems. The term is derived from Ancient Greek word ζῷον (zōon), i.e. "animal" and λόγος, (logos), i.e. "knowledge, study". To study the variety of animals that exist (or have existed), see list of animals by common name and lists of animals.

== Essence of zoology ==
- Animal
- Fauna

== Branches of zoology ==
=== Branches by group studied ===
- Arthropodology - study of arthropods as a whole
  - Carcinology - the study of crustaceans
  - Entomology - study of insects
    - Coleopterology - study of beetles
    - Dipterology - study of flies
    - Hemipterology - study of true bugs
    - Lepidopterology - study of butterflies and moths
    - Melittology - study of bees
    - Myrmecology - study of ants
    - Odonatology - study of dragonflies and damselflies
    - Orthopterology - study of grasshoppers and crickets
  - Myriapodology - study of millipedes and centipedes
  - Arachnology - study of spiders and related animals such as scorpions, pseudoscorpions, and harvestmen, collectively called arachnids
    - Acarology - study of mites and ticks
    - Araneology - study of spiders
    - Scorpiology - study of scorpions
- Ichthyology - study of fish
- Malacology - study of mollusks
  - Conchology - study of shells
  - Teuthology - study of cephalopods
- Nematology - study of nematodes (roundworms)
- Herpetology - study of amphibians and reptiles
  - Batrachology - study of amphibians including frogs and toads, salamanders, newts, and caecilians
  - Cheloniology - study of turtles and tortoises
  - Saurology - study of lizards
  - Ophiology - study of snakes
- Ornithology - study of birds
- Mammalogy - study of mammals
  - Cetology - study of cetaceans
  - Felinology - study of cats
  - Hippology - study of horses
  - Primatology - study of primates
  - Rodentology - study of rodents
- Parasitology - study of parasites, their hosts, and the relationship between them
  - Helminthology - study of parasitic worms (helminths)
- Planktology - study of plankton, various small drifting plants, animals and microorganisms that inhabit bodies of water
- Protozoology - study of protozoan, the "animal-like" (i.e., motile and heterotrophic) protists

=== By nature of studies ===
- Anatomy - the study of the internal structure of animals
  - Comparative anatomy - comparative anatomy of different animals
  - Dermatology - study of skin
  - Embryology - study of embryonic development
  - Histology - study of tissues
  - Osteology - study of bones
- Anthrozoology - study of interaction between humans and other animals
- Behavioral ecology - study of environmental effects on animal behaviors
- Biochemistry - study of the chemical constituents and metabolic pathways of animal cells
- Biotechnology - manipulation of animal cells using genetic engineering and related technology
- Cytology - study of cells
- Ethology - study of animal behaviour, usually with a focus on behaviour under natural conditions, and viewing behaviour as an evolutionarily adaptive trait
  - Neuroethology - study of animal behavior and its underlying mechanistic control by the nervous system
- Genetics - study of inheritance and gene expression
  - Epigenetics - study of factors affecting gene expression
  - Mendelian genetics - genetics based on Mendelian inheritance
  - Molecular genetics - study of gene expression and behaviour
  - Non-Mendelian genetics - genetics that does not follow Mendel's laws
- Morphology - the study of the external structure of animals
  - Anatomy - internal morphology
  - Eidonomy - external morphology
- Pathology - the study of diseases
- Paleozoology - the branch of Paleontology that studies animal remains
- Physiology - the study of functioning of body systems
  - Andrology - study of the male reproductive tract
  - Cardiology - study of the heart and cardiovascular system
  - Endocrinology - study of endocrine systems
  - Gastroenterology - study of the digestive system
  - Gynaecology - study of the female reproductive tract
  - Immunology - study of the immune system
  - Myology - study of muscles
  - Nephrology - study of the urinary system
  - Neurology - study of the neural system
  - Pulmonology - study of the respiratory system
- Zooarchaeology - study of animal remains in relation to ancient people
- Zoogeography - Zoogeography is the scientific study of geographical distribution of animal species (both historic and contemporary) in the world
- Zoography - Zoography is study of animals and their habitats (also known as descriptive zoology)
- Zoometry - is a sub-division of zoology that deals with measurements (length or size) of animal parts

== History of zoology ==
- Timeline of zoology
- History of zoology (through 1859)
- History of zoology (since 1859)

== Animals ==
Animals

- Lists of animals

=== Taxonomy of Animalia ===
Kingdom: Animalia

- Subkingdom Parazoa
  - Porifera (sponges)
  - Placozoa
- Subkingdom Eumetazoa
  - Radiata (unranked)
    - Ctenophora (comb jellies)
    - Cnidaria
    - Trilobozoa †
  - Bilateria (unranked)
    - Acoelomorpha
    - Tullimonstrum †
    - Proarticulata †
    - Mesozoa (unranked)
      - Orthonectida
      - Rhombozoa
      - Monoblastozoa
    - Nephrozoa (unranked)
      - Chaetognatha
      - Superphylum Deuterostomia
        - Chordata
        - Hemichordata
        - Echinodermata
        - Xenoturbellida
        - Vetulicolia †
      - Protostomia (unranked)
        - Superphylum Ecdysozoa
          - Kinorhyncha
          - Loricifera
          - Priapulida
          - Nematoda (nematodes)
          - Nematomorpha
          - Onychophora
          - Tardigrada
          - Arthropoda - includes insects, arachnids (spiders), myriapods, and crustaceans (crabs, lobsters, etc.)
        - Superphylum Platyzoa
          - Platyhelminthes
          - Gastrotricha
          - Rotifera
          - Acanthocephala
          - Gnathostomulida
          - Micrognathozoa
          - Cycliophora
        - Superphylum Lophotrochozoa
          - Sipuncula
          - Hyolitha †
          - Nemertea
          - Phoronida
          - Bryozoa
          - Entoprocta
          - Brachiopoda
          - Mollusca
          - Annelida

== General zoology concepts ==
- Taxonomy
- Selection breed
- Natural selection
- Breed
- Cross breed
- Pure breed
- Hybrid
- Clade
- Monophyly
- Polyphyly
- Speciation
- Isolating mechanisms
- Species
  - Phenetic species
  - Biological species
  - Recognition species
  - Ecological species
  - Pluralistic species

== Notable zoologists ==
In alphabetical order by surname:

- Louis Agassiz (malacology, ichthyology)
- Aristotle
- Pierre Joseph Bonnaterre
- Archie Carr (herpetology, esp. cheloniology)
- Eugenie Clark (ichthyology)
- Jeff Corwin (most animals)
- Georges Cuvier (founder of comparative morphology)
- Charles Darwin (formulated modern theory of evolution)
- Richard Dawkins (ethology)
- Dian Fossey (primatology)
- Birutė Galdikas (primatology)
- Jane Goodall (primatology)
- Victor Hensen (planktology)
- Libbie Hyman (invertebrate zoology)
- Steve Irwin (herpetology)
- William Kirby (father of entomology)
- Hans-Wilhelm Koepcke (ornithology, herpetology)
- Carl Linnaeus (father of systematics)
- Konrad Lorenz (ethology)
- David W. Macdonald (wild mammals)
- Ernst Mayr (evolutionary biologist)
- Desmond Morris (ethology)
- Richard Owen (proposed archetypes for major groups of organisms)
- Roger Tory Peterson (ornithology)
- William Emerson Ritter (marine biology)
- Thomas Say (entomology)
- Jakob von Uexküll (animal behavior, invertebrate zoology)
- E. O. Wilson (entomology, founder of sociobiology)
- more...

== Zoology lists ==
- Lists of animals
- Ant genera (alphabetical)
  - British ant species (common names)
  - Non-endemic ant species introduced to Great Britain and Ireland
  - Myrmecology topics
- Amblypygid genera
- Birds
  - Santa Cruz County, California
  - Sibley–Monroe checklist
- Domesticated animals
- Cat breeds
- Dog breeds
- Freshwater aquarium fish species
- Horse breeds
- Marine reptiles
- Externally visible animal parts
- Endangered species in the U.S.
- Category:Lists of individual animals

== See also ==
- List of Russian zoologists
- Outline of biology#Zoology
