= Parenchymia =

Scientific classification
- Domain: Eukaryota
- Kingdom: Animalia
- Subkingdom: Eumetazoa
- Clade: ParaHoxozoa
- Clade: Bilateria
- Clade: Nephrozoa
- Clade: Protostomia
- Clade: Spiralia
- Superphylum: Lophotrochozoa
- Clade: Parenchymia

Phyla
- Platyhelminthes; Nemertea

Parenchymia is a proposed clade encompassing Nemertea and Platyhelminthes. The clade was suggested in a 2019 study showing the clade as a sister to Annelida, with both groups together being sister to Lophophorata. The synapomorphies include similar organization of ciliary bands in the larva of both groups, as well as a lack of chitin, and is named for the abundant parenchyma found between the body wall and internal organs of both. A similar taxon, with Mollusca being likewise linked together with Symbion and Entoprocta, has been proposed in a clade called Tetraneuralia.

== Phylogeny ==
- Protostomia
  - Ecdysozoa
  - Spiralia (s.l.) / Gnathospiralia
    - Gnathifera
    - Lophotrochozoa / Platytrochozoa / Spiralia (s.s.)
      - Tetraneuralia
        - Mollusca
        - Entoprocta
      - - - Gastrotricha
          - Lophophorata
            - - Ectoprocta
              - Phoronida
            - Brachiopoda
        - - Annelida
          - Parenchymia
            - Platyhelminthes
            - Nemertea
