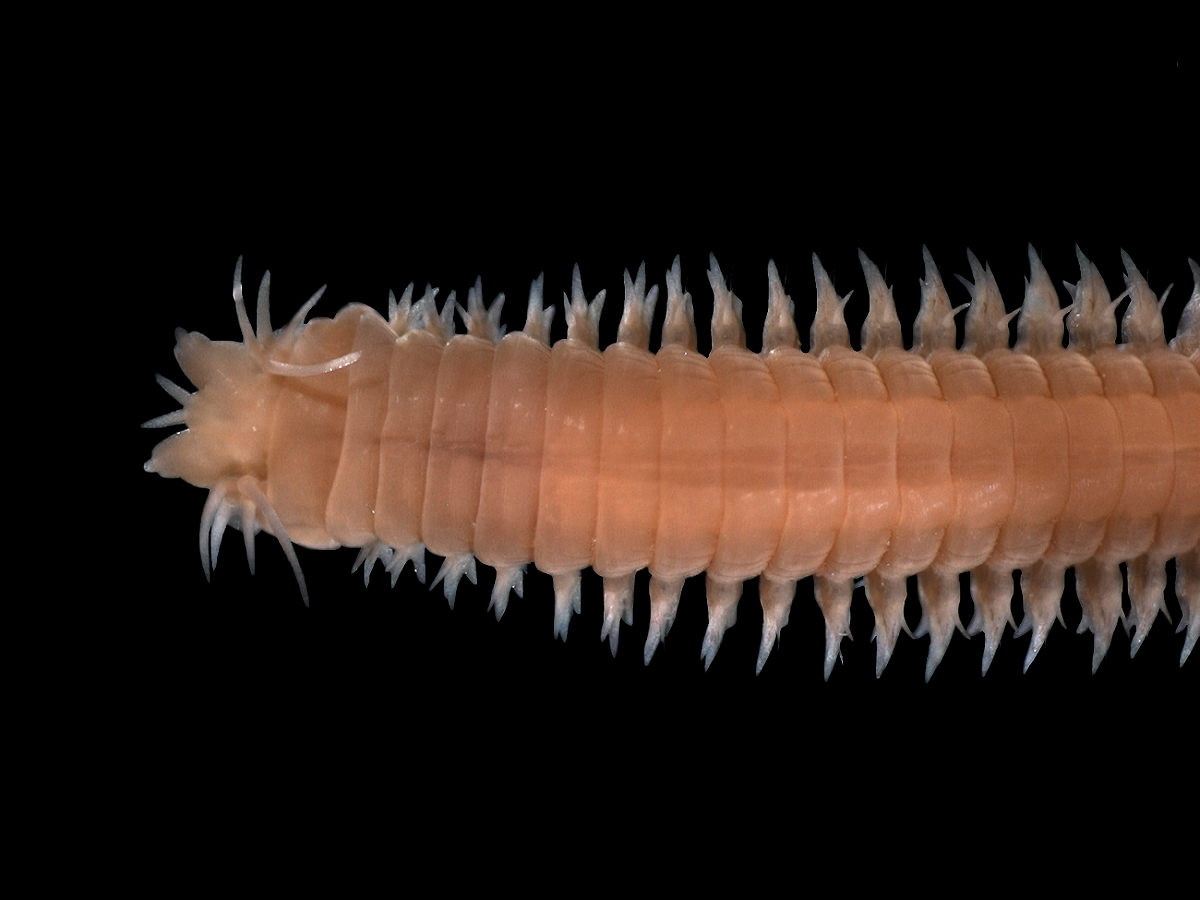
- Eunereis longissima Johnston, 1840

Scientific classification
- Kingdom: Animalia
- Subkingdom: Eumetazoa
- Clade: ParaHoxozoa
- Clade: Bilateria
- Clade: Nephrozoa
- Clade: Protostomia
- Clade: Spiralia
- Superphylum: Lophotrochozoa
- (unranked): Trochozoa

Phyla
- Annelida; Brachiozoa; †"Tommotiida" (paraphyletic); Brachiopoda; Phoronida; Mollusca; Nemertea

= Trochozoa =

Trochozoa Temporal range: Cambrian Stage 2 – Recent

Taxonomic clade

The Trochozoa are a proposed Lophotrochozoa clade that is a sister clade of Bryozoa and Platyzoa. The clade would include animals in five phyla: the Nemertea, the Annelida, the Mollusca, and the two Brachiozoan phyla, Brachiopoda and Phoronida. Both annelids and molluscs have been suggested as the sister group of Brachiozoa. It has also been proposed that nemerteans are actually a clade of annelids.

== Phylogeny ==
- Spiralia
  - Gnathifera
  - Platytrochozoa
    - Rouphozoa
      - Gastrotricha
      - Platyhelminthes
    - Lophotrochozoa
      - Polyzoa
        - - Entoprocta
          - Cycliophora
        - Bryozoa/Ectoprocta
      - Trochozoa
        - - - Brachiozoa
              - Brachiopoda
              - Phoronida
            - Mollusca
          - Annelida
            - - Echiura
              - - Clitellata
                - Siboglinidae
            - Sipuncula
        - Nemertea
