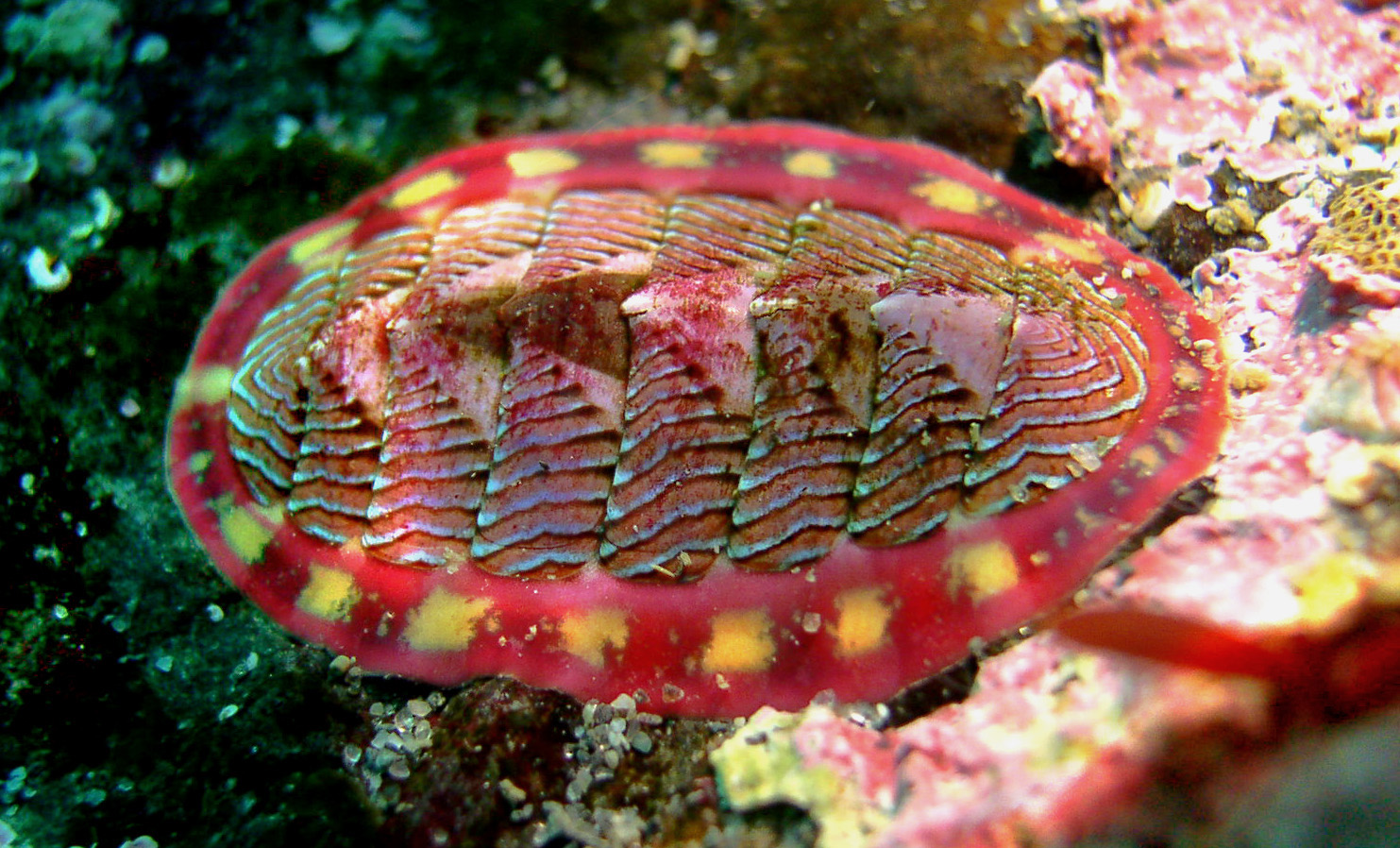
- The lined chiton Tonicella lineata, a polyplacophoran mollusc
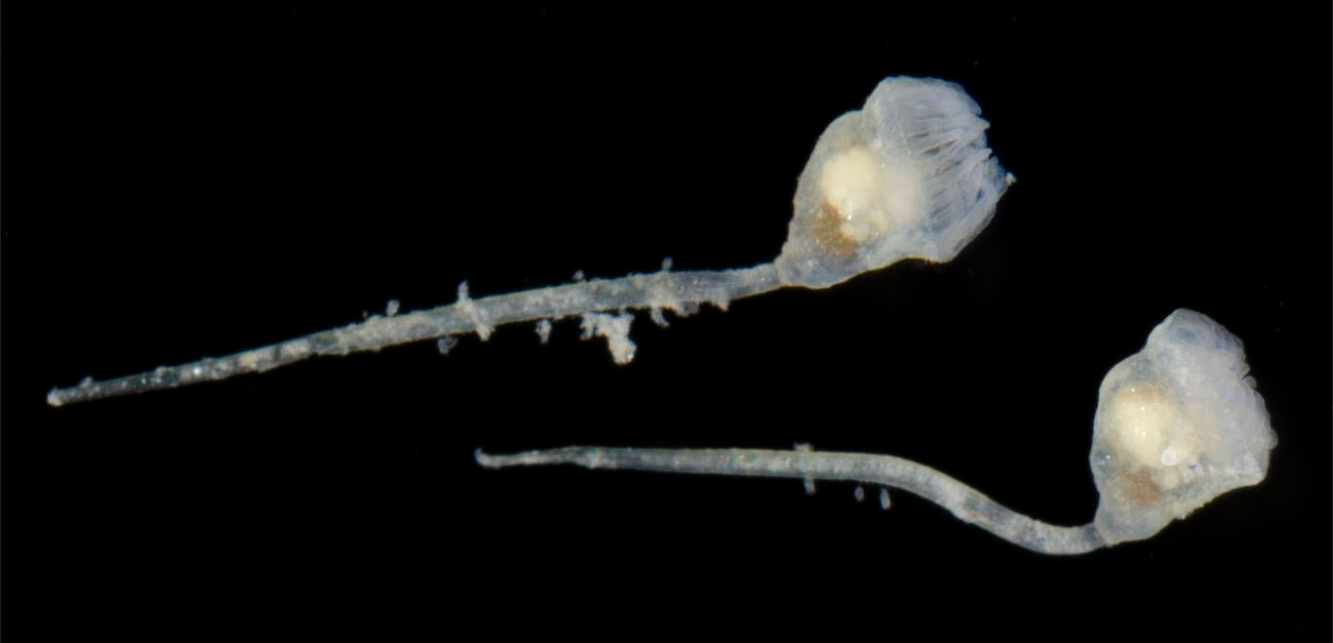
- Barentsia laxa, an entoproct

Scientific classification
- Kingdom: Animalia
- Subkingdom: Eumetazoa
- Clade: ParaHoxozoa
- Clade: Bilateria
- Clade: Nephrozoa
- Clade: Protostomia
- Clade: Spiralia
- Superphylum: Lophotrochozoa
- Clade: Tetraneuralia; Wanniger, 2009

Phyla
- Mollusca; Entoprocta

= Tetraneuralia =

Proposed clade of spiralian bilaterians

Tetraneuralia is a proposed clade of spiralian bilaterians uniting the phyla Mollusca and Entoprocta. belonging to Lophotrochozoa that groups mollusks, entoprocts and the extinct family Cupithecidae. The clade is supported by several morphological similarities between the two and has turned out to be important for evolution of mollusks.

It has been proposed by malacologists and zoologists when they observed that several morphological characteristics of entoprocts were clearly similar to those of mollusks. Both mollusks and entoprocts share a similar muscular system, the cuticle is the same in both, the hemolymph of the circulatory system is very similar, they have a tetraneuro nervous system with two pedal or ventral nerve cords. From this last characteristic the clade takes its name "tetraneuralia". Finally, entoprocts present similarities in the larval phases, they have a type of unique trochophore larva called "polyplacophora" and a complex larval apical organ.4 Molluscs are coelomate animals, in some cases equipped with shells, while entoprocts and cyclophores are acoelomates in habit. sessile.

Although the synapomorphies are strong, few molecular studies have been able to support it, until a recent molecular study has been able to strongly support it and therefore this relationship could be correct. The Tetraneuralia clade constituted the most basal clade of Lophotrochozoa according to molecular analyses. First proposed in 2009 based on similarities between entoproct larvae and polyplacophoran molluscs, it was recovered in 2019 in a phylogenomic study by Marlétaz et al.

== Phylogeny ==
In the most recent study, Tetraneuralia was recovered at the base of Lophotrochozoa.

- Protostomia
  - Ecdysozoa
  - Spiralia (s.l.) / Gnathospiralia
    - Gnathifera
    - Lophotrochozoa / Platytrochozoa / Spiralia (s.s.)
      - Tetraneuralia
        - Mollusca
        - Entoprocta
      - - - Gastrotricha
          - Lophophorata
            - - Ectoprocta
              - Phoronida
            - Brachiopoda
        - - Annelida
          - Parenchymia
            - Platyhelminthes
            - Nemertea
