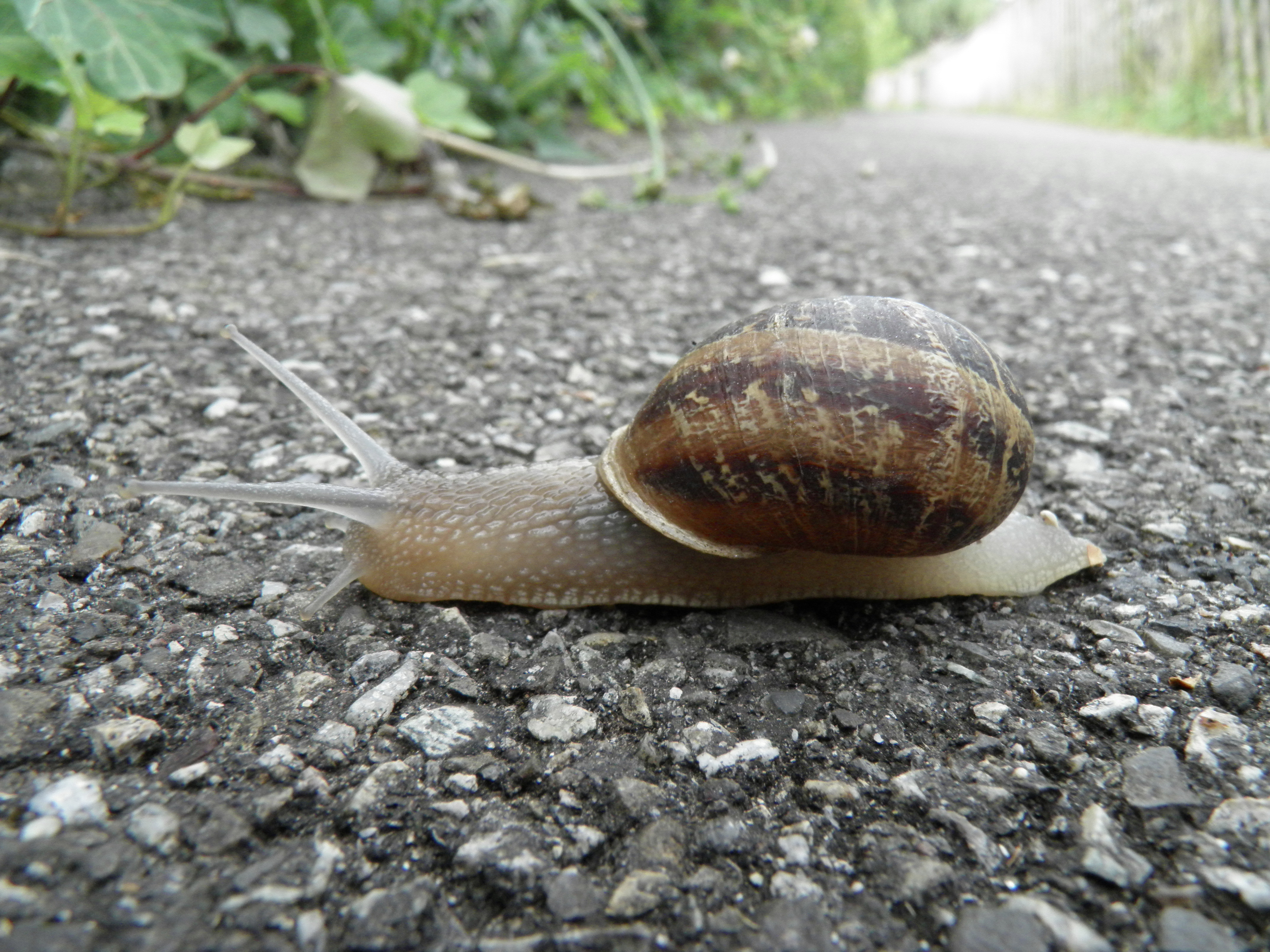
- Garden snail (Cornu aspersum) a basal platytrochozoan
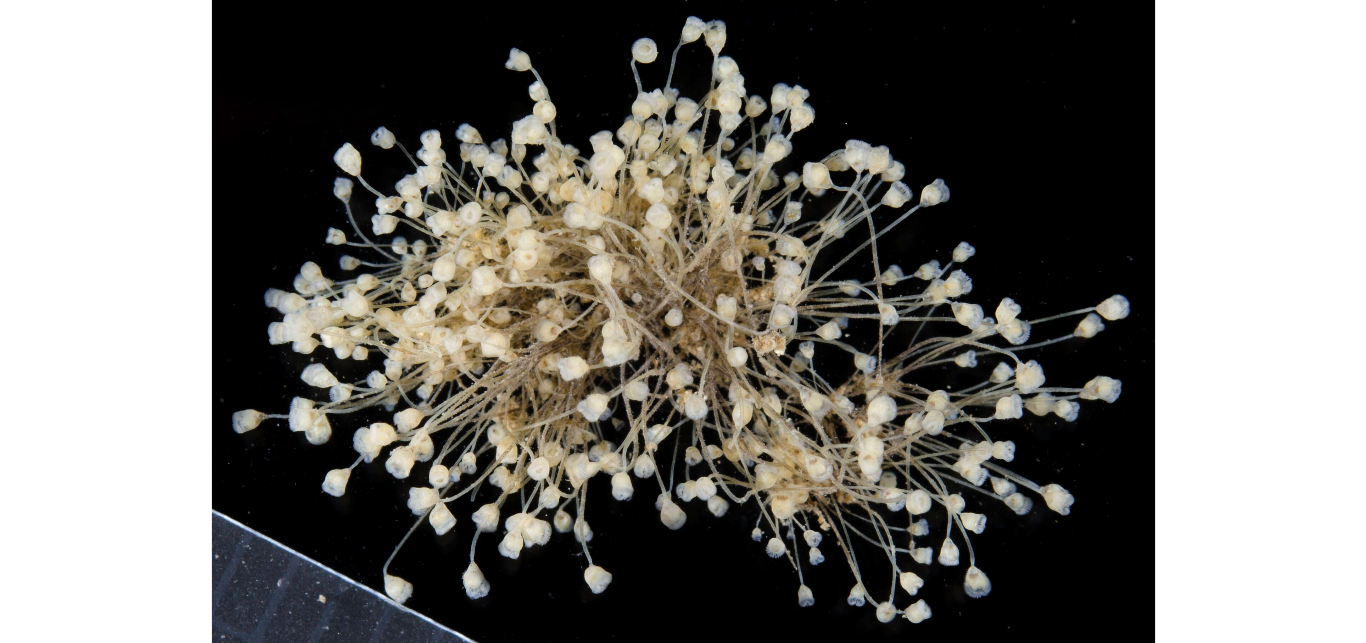
- Barentsia laxa colony (Entoprocta)

Scientific classification
- Kingdom: Animalia
- Subkingdom: Eumetazoa
- Clade: ParaHoxozoa
- Clade: Bilateria
- Clade: Nephrozoa
- Clade: Protostomia
- Clade: Spiralia
- Clade: Platytrochozoa; Struck et al. 2014

Clade
- Rouphozoa; Lophotrochozoa; Mesozoa?

= Platytrochozoa =

Basal clade of protostome animals

The Platytrochozoa are a proposed basal clade of spiralian animals as the sister group of the Gnathifera. The Platytrochozoa were divided into the Rouphozoa and the Lophotrochozoa. A more recent study suggests that the mesozoans also belong to this group of animals, as sister of the Rouphozoa.

- Spiralia
  - Gnathifera
  - Platytrochozoa
    - - Rouphozoa
        - Gastrotricha
        - Platyhelminthes
      - Mesozoa
    - - Lophotrochozoa

An alternative phylogeny was given in 2019, with a basal grouping of Mollusca and Entoprocta named Tetraneuralia, and a second grouping of Nemertea and Platyhelminthes named Parenchymia as sister of Annelida. In this proposal, Lophotrochozoa would become roughly synonymous with Platytrochozoa, and Rouphozoa would be unsupported.

- Protostomia
  - Ecdysozoa
  - Spiralia (s.l.) / Gnathospiralia
    - Gnathifera
    - Lophotrochozoa / Platytrochozoa / Spiralia (s.s.)
      - Tetraneuralia
        - Entoprocta
        - Mollusca
      - - - Gastrotricha
          - Lophophorata
            - Brachiopoda
            - - Ectoprocta
              - Phoronida
        - - Annelida
          - Parenchymia
            - Nemertea
            - Platyhelminthes

In the 2022 study the Platytrochozoa clade is not recovered at all; spiralians (in this case identical with the Lophotrochozoa according to its definition) are divided into "Platyzoa s.l." (traditional Platyzoa expanded to include Bryozoa and Mesozoa) and Trochozoa clades:

- Spiralia/ Lophotrochozoa
  - Platyzoa s.l.
    - Bryozoa/Ectoprocta
    - - - Entoprocta
        - Cycliophora
      - - Gastrotricha
        - - Gnathifera
          - - Platyhelminthes
            - Mesozoa
  - Trochozoa
    - - - Annelida
        - Brachiozoa
      - Nemertea
    - Mollusca
