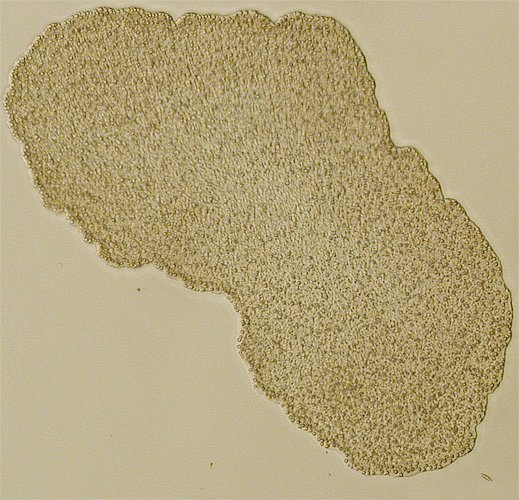
- Trichoplax adhaerens.

Scientific classification
- Kingdom: Animalia
- Subkingdom: Agnotozoa Moore et al., 1952

Phyla
- Placozoa; Mesozoa

= Agnotozoa =

Animals without organs

Agnotozoa is a rejected subkingdom of simple animals that is now considered polyphyletic. It is one of the three "traditional" animal subkingdoms, along with Parazoa and Eumetazoa. On some classifications, it is nearly synonymous with Mesozoa which is also considered rejected but with some minority studies still supporting it. Even if Mesozoa were valid their position is unequivocally inside Bilateria and not as separate subkingdom. Placozoa is now also considered an Eumetazoan or Myriazoan inside the clade ParaHoxozoa.

Agnotozoa was first used as one of the branches of the subkingdom Metazoa. It was then considered to contain only one group, Mesozoa.

More recently, some have used the name to refer to a subkingdom of three small phyla of simple animals without organs, Placozoa, Orthonectida, and Rhombozoa. They are known as "simple" though they have differentiated tissue, because that tissue is only organized in simple ways; for example, by being layered. The Orthonectida and Rhombozoa are grouped into the Mesozoa.

Biologists today generally do not use the taxon Agnotozoa because it is doubted that placozoans are closely related to mesozoans and that orthonectids and rhombozoans are related to each other. Even if the two are related, there is little need for another name in addition to mesozoa.

Agnotozoa represents a novel lineage of microbial eukaryotes that has been identified through environmental sequencing but remains largely uncharacterized due to the challenges of culturing these organisms. Phylogenetic analyses suggest that Agnotozoa may share a common ancestry with certain opisthokont or stramenopile lineages, though their precise evolutionary placement is still debated
