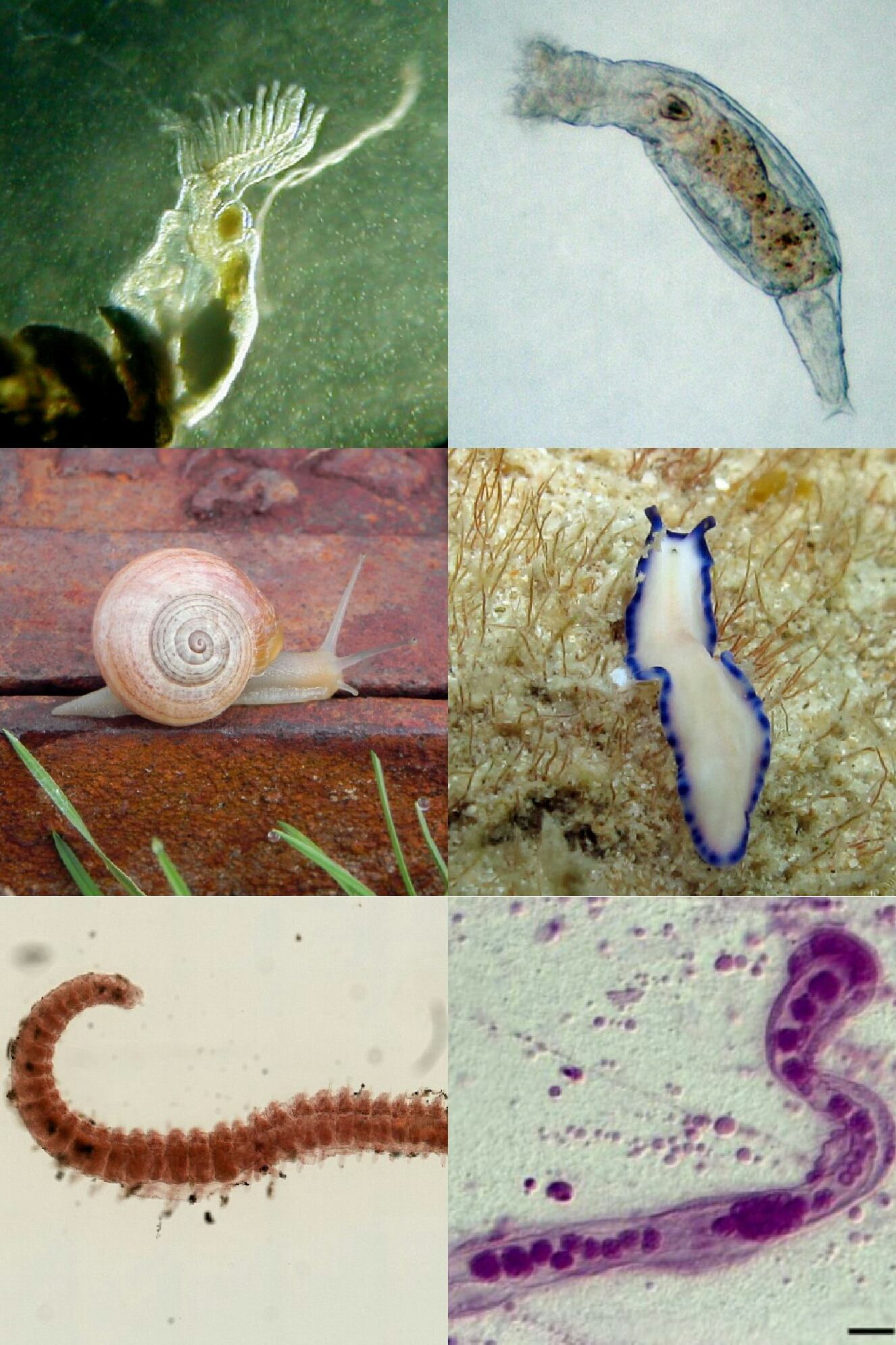

Scientific classification
- Kingdom: Animalia
- Subkingdom: Eumetazoa
- Clade: ParaHoxozoa
- Clade: Bilateria
- Clade: Nephrozoa
- Clade: Protostomia
- Clade: Spiralia sensu Edgecombe et al. 2011

Clades
- Gnathifera; Platytrochozoa

= Spiralia =

Spiralia Temporal range: Cambrian–Recent Possible Ediacaran fossil

Clade of protostomes with spiral cleavage during early development

The Spiralia are a morphologically diverse clade of protostome animals, including within their number the molluscs, annelids, platyhelminths and other taxa. The term Spiralia is applied to those phyla that exhibit canonical spiral cleavage, a pattern of early development found in most members of the Lophotrochozoa.

== Distribution of spiralian development across phylogeny ==
Members of the molluscs, annelids, platyhelminths and nemerteans have all been shown to exhibit spiral cleavage in its classical form. Other spiralian phyla (rotifers, brachiopods, phoronids, gastrotrichs, and bryozoans) are also said to display a derived form of spiral cleavage in at least a portion of their constituent species, although evidence for this is sparse.

== Phylogeny ==
Early on the study of the group, spiral cleavage was thought to be unique to the Spiralia in the strictest sense—animals such as molluscs and annelids, which exhibit classical spiral cleavage. The presence of spiral cleavage in animals such as platyhelminths could be difficult to correlate with some phylogenies. Evidence of a close relationship between molluscs, annelids and lophophorates was found in 1995 and Lophotrochozoa was defined as the group containing these taxa and all the descendants of their last common ancestor. With this understanding, the presence of spiral cleavage in polyclad platyhelminths, as well as the more traditional Spiralia, has led to the hypothesis that spiral cleavage was present ancestrally across the Lophotrochozoa as a whole. With the rapid advances in phylogenomics various studies have come up to propose different configurations and relationships of spiralian phyla.

In 2019, a phylogenetic analysis by Marlétaz et al. recovered a basal grouping Mollusca with Entoprocta grouping named Tetraneuralia, and a second grouping of Nemertea with Platyhelminthes named Parenchymia as sister of Annelida. In their proposal, Lophotrochozoa includes Platyhelminthes and Gastrotricha, turning into a senior synonym for Platytrochozoa, according to its original definition. In the same year, Laumer et al. recovered once again the clade Rouphozoa as a basal Platytrochozoa clade.

A 2022 study by Drábková et al. supported the Trochozoa and Platyzoa hypotheses. The same year another study by Khalturin et al. placed Bryozoa, Entoprocta and Cycliophora in the group Polyzoa as one of the earliest branches among Lophotrochozoa.

A modern consensus phylogenetic tree for Spiralia is shown below, mainly based on the one by Struck (2026), which summarizes relationships found in phylogenomic studies from 2019 to 2025:

- Protostomia
  - Ecdysozoa
  - Spiralia / Lophotrochozoa (s.lss.)
    - Gnathifera (s.l.) / Chaetognathifera
      - Chaetognatha
      - Gnathostomulida
      - - Micrognathozoa
        - Rotifera
    - Platytrochozoa / Lophotrochozoa (s.l.)
      - - Cycliophora
        - Entoprocta
      - Rouphozoa
        - Gastrotricha
        - Platyhelminthes
      - ?Dicyemida
      - ?Orthonectida
      - Annelida
      - Nemertea
      - Mollusca
      - Lophophorata
        - Brachiopoda
        - - Bryozoa
          - Phoronida
