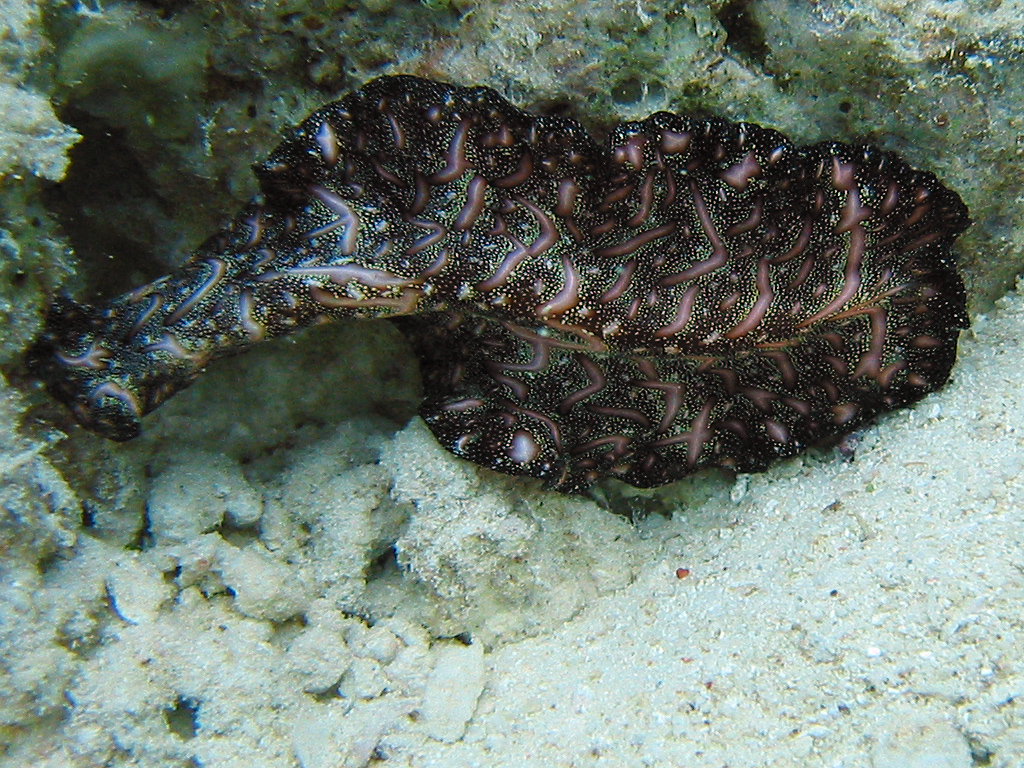
- Pseudobiceros bedfordi (Bedford's flatworm)

Scientific classification
- Kingdom: Animalia
- Subkingdom: Eumetazoa
- Clade: ParaHoxozoa
- Clade: Bilateria
- Clade: Nephrozoa
- Clade: Protostomia
- Clade: Spiralia
- Superphylum: Platyzoa; Cavalier-Smith, 1998

Phyla
- Gastrotricha; Gnathifera (unranked); Gnathostomulida; Micrognathozoa; Syndermata (Rotifera); including Acanthocephala; Chaetognatha; †Amiskwia (not placed in a phylum); †Timorebestia (stem-chaetognath); †Inquicus; †Nectocarididae?; Platyhelminthes; Mesozoa (unranked)?; Dicyemida; ?Monoblastozoa; ?Orthonectida

= Platyzoa =

Platyzoa Temporal range: Cambrian–Recent

Superphylum of unsegmented animals

The "Platyzoa" /ˌplætɪˈzoʊ.ə/ are a group of protostome unsegmented animals proposed by Thomas Cavalier-Smith in 1998. Cavalier-Smith included in Platyzoa the phylum Platyhelminthes (or flatworms), and a new phylum, the Acanthognatha, into which he gathered several previously described phyla of microscopic animals. Later it has been described as paraphyletic, containing the Rouphozoa and the Gnathifera. Since 2022 it is believed that Platyzoa are monophyletic and also includes Mesozoa.

== Phyla ==
One scheme placed the following phyla in Platyzoa:

- Rouphozoa
  - Platyhelminthes
  - Gastrotricha
- Gnathifera
  - Syndermata
    - Rotifera
    - Seisonida
  - Acanthocephala
  - Gnathostomulida
  - Micrognathozoa
  - Cycliophora

== Characteristics ==
None of the Platyzoa groups have a respiration or circulation system because of their small size, flat body or parasitic lifestyle. The Platyhelminthes and Gastrotricha are acoelomate. The other phyla have a pseudocoel, and share characteristics such as the structure of their jaws and pharynx, although these have been secondarily lost in the parasitic Acanthocephala. They form a monophyletic subgroup called the Gnathifera.

The name "Platyzoa" is used because most members are flat, though rotifers are not.

== Classification ==
- Spiralia
  - Gnathifera
  - Platytrochozoa
    - - Rouphozoa
        - Gastrotricha
        - Platyhelminthes
    - Lophotrochozoa

A cladogram of Spiralia modified from Struck et al. 2014

The Platyzoa are close relatives of the Lophotrochozoa. Together the two make up the Spiralia.

Syndermata was a proposed clade that included Acanthocephala and rotifers, but as it appears they are not sister groups after all, the clade has been abandoned.

A recent possible cladogram is shown which would show that the Lophotrochozoa emerged within Platyzoa as a sister group of the Rouphozoa (the Gastrotricha and Platyhelminthes). The Lophotrochozoa and Rouphozoa are then named the Platytrochozoa. This makes the Platyzoa a paraphyletic group.
