= Loxokalypodidae =

Scientific classification
- Domain: Eukaryota
- Kingdom: Animalia
- Phylum: Entoprocta
- Family: Loxokalypodidae; Emschermann, 1972

Family of marine animals

Loxokalypodidae is a family of Entoprocta, sometimes classified in the order Coloniales. It contains only the genus Loxokalypus Emschermann, 1972.
