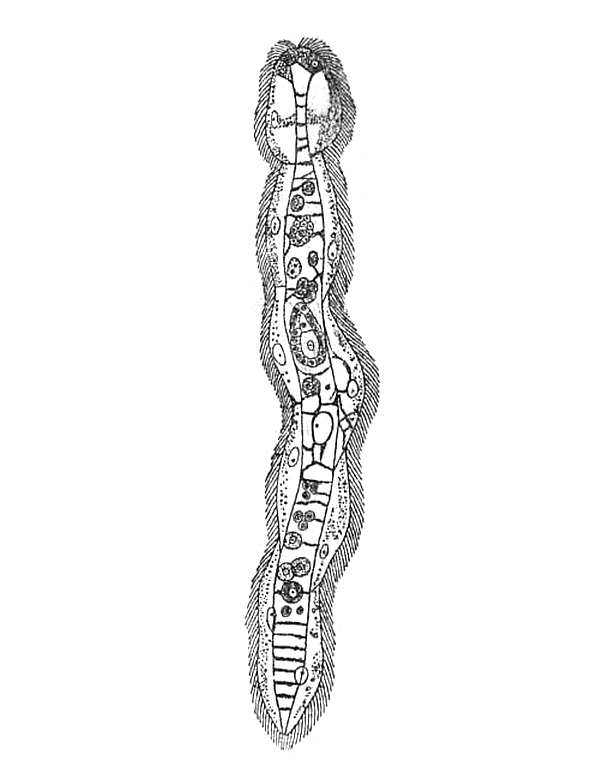
- Dicyema macrocephalum

Scientific classification
- Kingdom: Animalia
- Subkingdom: Eumetazoa
- Clade: ParaHoxozoa
- Clade: Bilateria
- Clade: Nephrozoa
- Clade: Protostomia
- Clade: Spiralia
- Clade: Platytrochozoa
- (unranked): Mesozoa van Beneden, 1876

Phyla
- Dicyemida?; ?Monoblastozoa; ?Orthonectida

= Mesozoa =

Subkingdom of worm-like parasites of marine invertebrates

The Mesozoa are minuscule, worm-like parasites of marine invertebrates. Generally, these tiny, elusive creatures consist of a somatoderm (outer layer) of ciliated cells surrounding one or more reproductive cells.

A 2017 study recovered Mesozoa as a monophyletic group that emerged in the Lophotrochozoa as sister of the Rouphozoa.

Some workers previously classified Mesozoa as the sole phylum of the lonely subkingdom Agnotozoa. Cavalier-Smith argued that at least some of the mesozoans are in fact protistans, not animals.

In the 19th century, the Mesozoa were a wastebasket taxon for multicellular organisms which lacked the invaginating gastrula which was thought to define the Metazoa.

== Evolution ==
Mesozoa were once thought to be evolutionary intermediate forms between Protozoans and Metazoans, but now they are thought to be degenerate or simplified metazoa. Their ciliated larvae are similar to the miracidium of trematodes, and their internal multiplication is similar to what happens in the sporocysts of trematodes. Mesozoan DNA has a low GC-content (40%). This amount is similar to ciliates, but ciliates tend to be binucleate. Others relate mesozoa to a group including annelids, planarians and nemerteans.

Orthonectida have a very reduced muscular and nervous system, only consisting of a few cells, but so far no muscle cells or neurons have been found in Dicyemida.

== Groupings ==
The two main mesozoan groups are the Dicyemida and the Orthonectida. Other groups sometimes included in the Mesozoa are the Placozoa and the Monoblastozoa.

Monoblastozoans consist of a single description written in the 19th century of a species that has not been seen since. As such, many workers doubt that they are a real group. As described, the animal had only a single layer of tissue.

=== Rhombozoan mesozoans ===
Rhombozoa, or dicyemid mesozoans, are found in the nephrid tracts of squid and octopuses. They range from a few millimeters long with twenty to thirty cells that include anterior attachment cells and a long central reproductive cell called an axial cell. This axial cell may develop asexually into vermiform juveniles or it may produce eggs and sperm that self-fertilize to produce a ciliated infusiform larva.

There are three genera: Dicyema, Pseudicyema and Dicyemennea.

Molecular evidence suggests that this phylum are derived from the Lophotrochozoa.

=== Orthonectid mesozoans ===
Orthonectida are found in the body spaces of various marine invertebrates including tissue spaces, gonads, genitorespiratory bursae. This pathogen causes host castration of different species.

The best known of Orthonectida is the parasite of brittle stars. The multinucleate syncytial stage lives within tissues and spaces of the gonad but can spread into arms. It causes the destruction of starfish ovary and eggs to cause castration (the male gonads are usually unaffected). The stages of the plasmodium develop into more plasmodia by simple fragmentation; at some point, they decide to go sexual. The syncytia are dioecious (either male or female), but young syncytia can fuse to produce both male and female. The males are ciliated and smaller than the females. The females and the males leave the starfish and mate in the sea. Tailed sperm enters the female and fertilizes the numerous oocytes. Each oocyst produces a small ciliated larva which makes its way to another star.

The genome of one of these species – Intoshia linei – has been sequenced. The Orthonectids may be degenerate annelid worms.
