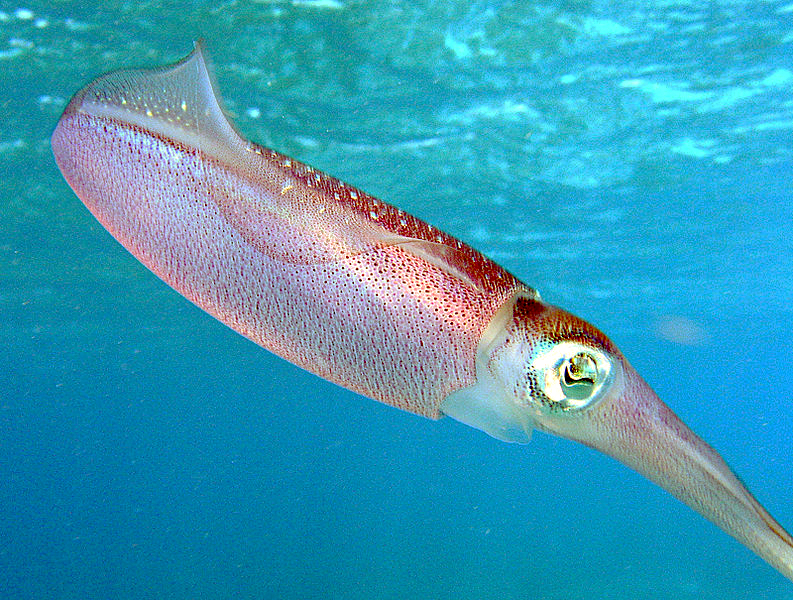
- Caribbean reef squid or Sepioteuthis sepioidea is a complex lophotrochozoan

Scientific classification
- Kingdom: Animalia
- Subkingdom: Eumetazoa
- Clade: ParaHoxozoa
- Clade: Bilateria
- Clade: Nephrozoa
- Clade: Protostomia
- Clade: Spiralia
- Superphylum: Lophotrochozoa; Halanych et al., 1995

Phyla
- Annelida; Lophophorata; Entoprocta; †Macrodontophion; Mollusca; Nemertea; †Namacalathus? (total group Lophotrochozoa); †Oikozetetes; Cycliophora?

= Lophotrochozoa =

Lophotrochozoa Temporal range: 536–0 Ma

Superphylum of animals

Lophotrochozoa (/ləˌfɒtroʊkoʊˈzoʊə/, "crest/wheel animals") is a clade of protostome animals within the Spiralia. The taxon was established as a monophyletic group based on molecular evidence. The clade includes animals like annelids, molluscs, bryozoans, and brachiopods.

== Groups ==
Lophotrochozoa was defined in 1995 as the "last common ancestor of the three traditional lophophorate taxa (brachiopods, bryozoans, and phoronid worms), the mollusks and the annelids, and all of the descendants of that common ancestor". It is a cladistic definition (a node-based name), so the affiliation to Lophotrochozoa of spiralian groups not mentioned directly in the definition depends on the topology of the spiralian tree of life, and in some phylogenetic hypotheses, Lophotrochozoa may even be synonymous to Spiralia. Nemertea and Orthonectida (if not directly considered as part of Annelida) are probably lophotrochozoan phyla; Dicyemida, Gastrotricha, and Platyhelminthes may be lophotrochozoans or placed in the Rouphozoa clade outside Lophotrochozoa; Chaetognatha, Gnathostomulida, Micrognathozoa, and Syndermata are probably gnathiferans and so placed as a basal spiralian clade outside Lophotrochozoa; Cycliophora could be a gnathiferan or a lophotrochozoan phylum. One of the candidate hypotheses is presented below.

The Lophotrochozoa has basal Cycliophora and Mollusca groups, and more derived Lophophorate, Nemertea and Annelida groups.

With the introduction of Platytrochozoa and Rouphozoa, one candidate phylogeny is pictured below – though other studies recover a range of alternative possibilities:

- Protostomes
  - Ecdysozoa
  - Spiralia
    - Gnathifera
    - Platytrochozoa
      - - Rouphozoa
          - Gastrotricha
          - Platyhelminthes
        - Mesozoa
      - Lophotrochozoa
        - Annelida
          - - Echiura
            - - Clitellata
              - Siboglinidae
          - Sipuncula
        - Mollusca
        - Lophophorata
          - Brachiozoa
            - Brachiopoda
            - Phoronida
          - Bryozoa s.l. (sedis mutabilis)
            - Ectoprocta
            - - Entoprocta
              - Cycliophora
        - Nemertea

Another study recovers Lophotrochozoa as equivalent to Platytrochozoa, forming a sister group with Gnathifera at the base of Spiralia.

- Protostomia
  - Ecdysozoa
  - Spiralia (s.l.) / Gnathospiralia
    - Gnathifera
    - Lophotrochozoa / Platytrochozoa / Spiralia (s.s.)
      - Tetraneuralia
        - Entoprocta
        - Mollusca
      - - - Gastrotricha
          - Lophophorata
            - Brachiopoda
            - - Ectoprocta
              - Phoronida
        - - Annelida
          - Parenchymia
            - Nemertea
            - Platyhelminthes

In the most recent research, Lophophorata was not recovered. The three phyla Cycliophora, Entoprocta and Bryozoa makes up a single clade Polyzoa and are the first to branch off from the other lophotrochozoans (trochozoans). The second split is the molluscs, and the third consists of two sister phyla, annelids and nemerteans. Lastly remains the clade that consist of the phoronids and the brachiopods.

- Lophotrochozoa
  - Trochozoa
    - - Brachiozoa
        - Phoronida
        - Brachiopoda
      - - Annelida
        - Nemertea
    - Mollusca
  - Polyzoa
    - Ectoprocta
    - - Cycliophora
      - Entoprocta

A number of fossil taxa can be identified as early lophotrochozoans, even if their precise affinity remains contested. However, relevant Cambrian fossils are debated.

== Characteristics ==
The clade Lophotrochozoa is named after the two distinct characteristics of its members; the lophophore, a feeding structure consisting of a ciliated crown of tentacles surrounding a mouth, and the developmental stage of the trochophore larva. Lophophorata such as Brachiozoa and Bryozoa have lophophores, while members of Trochozoa such as molluscs and annelids have trochophore larvae, although some may have none.
