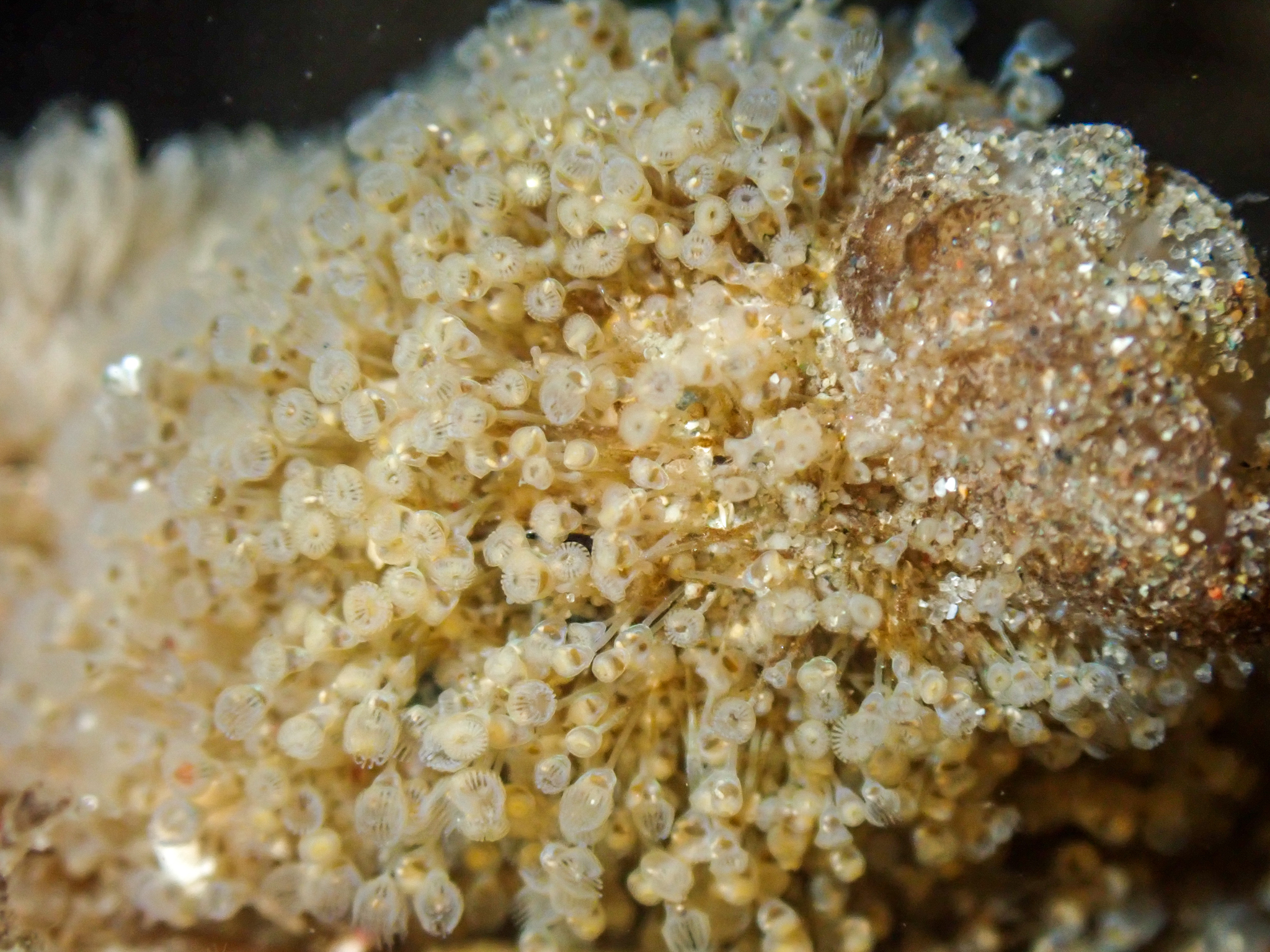
- Barentsia ramosa

Scientific classification
- Kingdom: Animalia
- Clade: Bilateria
- Clade: Nephrozoa
- Clade: Protostomia
- Clade: Spiralia
- Superphylum: Lophotrochozoa
- Clade: Polyzoa; Hejnol et al., 2009

Phyla
- Bryozoa; Entoprocta; Cycliophora

= Polyzoa =

Proposed Lophotrochozoa clade

Polyzoa is a proposed Lophotrochozoa clade that is the sister clade to Trochozoa. The clade consist of the three phyla Bryozoa, Entoprocta and Cycliophora.
