= Coloniales =

Scientific classification
- Domain: Eukaryota
- Kingdom: Animalia
- Phylum: Entoprocta
- Order: Coloniales

Order of invertebrates

Coloniales is an order of invertebrates belonging to the class Entoprocta.

Families:

- Loxosomatidae
