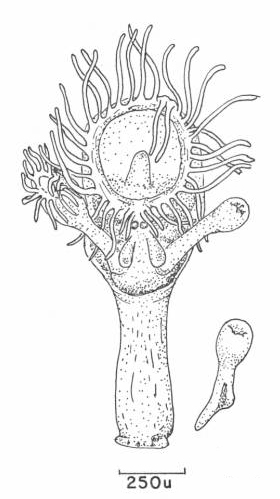
- Picture of Loxosomella macginitieorum

Scientific classification
- Kingdom: Animalia
- Phylum: Entoprocta
- Family: Loxosomatidae
- Genus: Loxosomella; Mortensen, 1911

= Loxosomella =

Genus of marine invertebrates

Loxosomella is a genus of Entoprocta. Individuals are solitary, not colonial, as is typically the case in this phylum. They are sessile, attaching to a variety of substrates including sipunculan worms. They can reproduce asexually, by budding.
