= Pedicellina =

Scientific classification
- Kingdom: Animalia
- Phylum: Entoprocta
- Order: Solitaria
- Family: Pedicellinidae
- Genus: Pedicellina; Sars, 1835

Genus of marine animals in the entoproct phylum

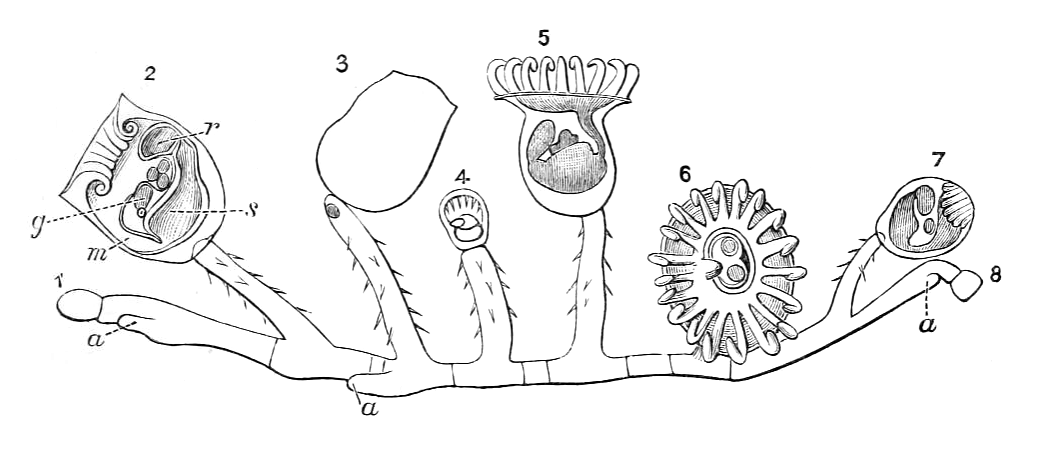
Pedicellina cernua

Pedicellina is a genus of the family Pedicellinidae in the phylum Entoprocta.

== Description ==
A genus of colonial Entoprocta.

== Etymology ==
From “pedicellus” (small foot in Latin) + “ina”.

== Taxonomy ==
Pedicellina contains the following species:

- Pedicellina cernua (Pallas, 1774) [Note: This was the first species discovered from today's genus Pedicellina. Originally, in 1774, it was placed in the genus Brachionus Pallas 1766, which is now placed in Rotifera]
- Pedicellina choanata O'Donoghue, 1924
- Pedicellina grandis Ryland, 1965
- Pedicellina hispida Ryland, 1965
- Pedicellina nannoda Marcus, 1937
- Pedicellina newberryi Wasson, 1997
- Pedicellina nutans Dalyell, 1848
- Pedicellina pernae Ryland, 1965
- Pedicellina pyriformis Ryland, 1965
- Pedicellina whiteleggii Johnston & Walker, 1917
