= Pedicellinidae =

Scientific classification
- Domain: Eukaryota
- Kingdom: Animalia
- Phylum: Entoprocta
- Order: Solitaria
- Family: Pedicellinidae; Johnston, 1847

Family of marine animals

Pedicellinidae is a family of Entoprocta, sometimes included in the order Solitaria.

Genera:

- Loxosomatoides Annandale, 1908
- Myopedicellina Shaw, Proctor & Borisanova, 2024 (synonym: Myosoma Robertson, 1900)
- Pedicellina Sars, 1835 (synonym: Crinomorpha van Beneden, 1844) [Note: The first species discovered from today's genus Pedicellina was originally, in 1774, placed in the Rotiferan genus Brachionus Pallas 1766.]
- Sangavella du Bois-Reymond-Marcus, 1957
