= Loxosomatidae =

Scientific classification
- Kingdom: Animalia
- Phylum: Entoprocta
- Family: Loxosomatidae; Hincks, 1880

Family of marine animals

Loxosomatidae is a family of Entoprocta, sometimes classified in the order Coloniales.

== Taxonomy ==
Loxosommella and Loxocalyx were split from Loxosoma in 1911 on the basis of foot morphology. While Loxosoma exhibits a sucking disc, both other genera comprise a foot gland and a foot groove. After the discovery of species showing both adult forms, Loxocalyx was merged into Loxosomella in 1964. Loxomorpha and Loxomitra, established as subgenera of Loxosomella and Loxosoma respectively, were erected to full genera in 1987. Nielsen (2010) proposed the use of only Loxosoma and Loxosomella, so species could be assigned to a genus even when the attachment organ is undescribed. A similar proposal by Iseto (2017) retains Loxomitra alongside the latter two.

A 2010 molecular phylogeny recovered Loxosomella as paraphyletic with respect to Loxocorone, Loxomitra, and Loxosoma. This topology was confirmed by a later 2015 study, although Loxosoma was recovered as non-monophyletic, with Loxosoma axisadversum occupying a basal position among solitary entoprocts.

The following genera are accepted according to WoRMS.

- Emschermannia Borisanova, 2016
- Loxomitra Nielsen, 1964
- Loxosoma Keferstein, 1862 (synonyms: Cyclatella Van Beneden & Hesse, 1863, Loxostemma Nielsen, 1966)
- Loxosomella Mortensen, 1911 (synonyms: Loxocorone Iseto, 2002, Loxomespilon Bobin & Prenant, 1953, Loxocalyx Mortensen, 1911)
