= Johannes Frenzel =

Johannes Frenzel (born 1858—died 1897) was a German botanist and zoologist.
