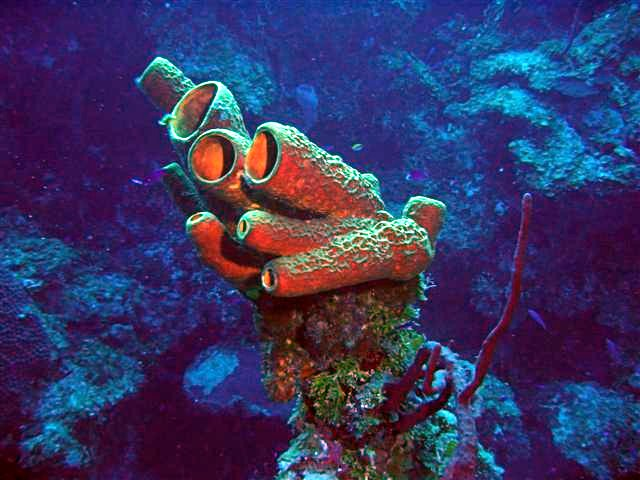
- Sponge

Scientific classification (obsolete as paraphyletic)
- Kingdom: Animalia
- Subkingdom: Parazoa

Subgroups
- Porifera; ?†Archaeocyatha; Placozoa?

Synonyms
- Enantiozoa, Delage 1892

= Parazoa =

Parazoa Temporal range: Tonian–Present

Ancestral subkingdom of animals

Parazoa (Parazoa, gr. Παρα-, para, "next to", and ζωα, zoa, "animals") is an obsolete subkingdom that is located at the base of the phylogenetic tree of the animal kingdom in opposition to the subkingdom Eumetazoa; they group together the most primitive forms, characterized by not having proper tissues or where, in any case, these tissues are only partially differentiated. It generally includes a single phylum, Porifera, which lack muscles, nerves and internal organs, which in many cases resembles a cell colony rather than a multicellular organism itself. All other animals are eumetazoans, which do have differentiated tissues.

== Porifera and Archaeocyatha ==
Porifera and the long gone extinct Archaeocyatha show similarities such as benthic and sessile habitat and the presence of pores, with differences such as the presence of internal walls and septa in Archaeocyatha. They have been considered separate phyla, however, the consensus is growing that Archaeocyatha was in fact a type of sponge that can be classified into Porifera. Many other fossil groups have uncertain affinity with porifera.

== Porifera and Placozoa ==
Some authors include in Parazoa the poriferous or sponge phyla and Placozoa on the basis of shared primitive characteristics: Both are simple, show a lack of true tissues and organs, have both asexual and sexual reproduction, and are invariably aquatic. As animals, they are a group that in various studies are at the base of the phylogenetic tree, albeit in a paraphyletic form. Of this group only surviving sponges, which belong to the phylum Porifera, and Trichoplax in the phylum Placozoa.

Parazoa do not show any body symmetry (they are asymmetric); all other groups of animals show some kind of symmetry. There are currently 5000 species, 150 of which are freshwater. The larvae are planktonic and the adults are sessile. The Parazoa–Eumetazoa division has been estimated to be 940 million years ago.

The Parazoa group is now considered paraphyletic. When referenced, it is sometimes considered an equivalent to the Porifera.

Some authors include the Placozoa, a phylum long thought to consist of a single species, Trichoplax adhaerens, in the division, but sometimes it is also placed in the Agnotozoa subkingdom.

== Phylogeny ==
According to the most up-to-date phylogeny, Porifera should not have a direct relationship with Placozoa. In any case, placozoans are likely simplified "coelenterates" without common characteristics with sponges.

- Animalia
  - Porifera
  - Eumetazoa
    - Ctenophora
    - ParaHoxozoa
      - Placozoa
      - - Cnidaria
        - Bilateria
