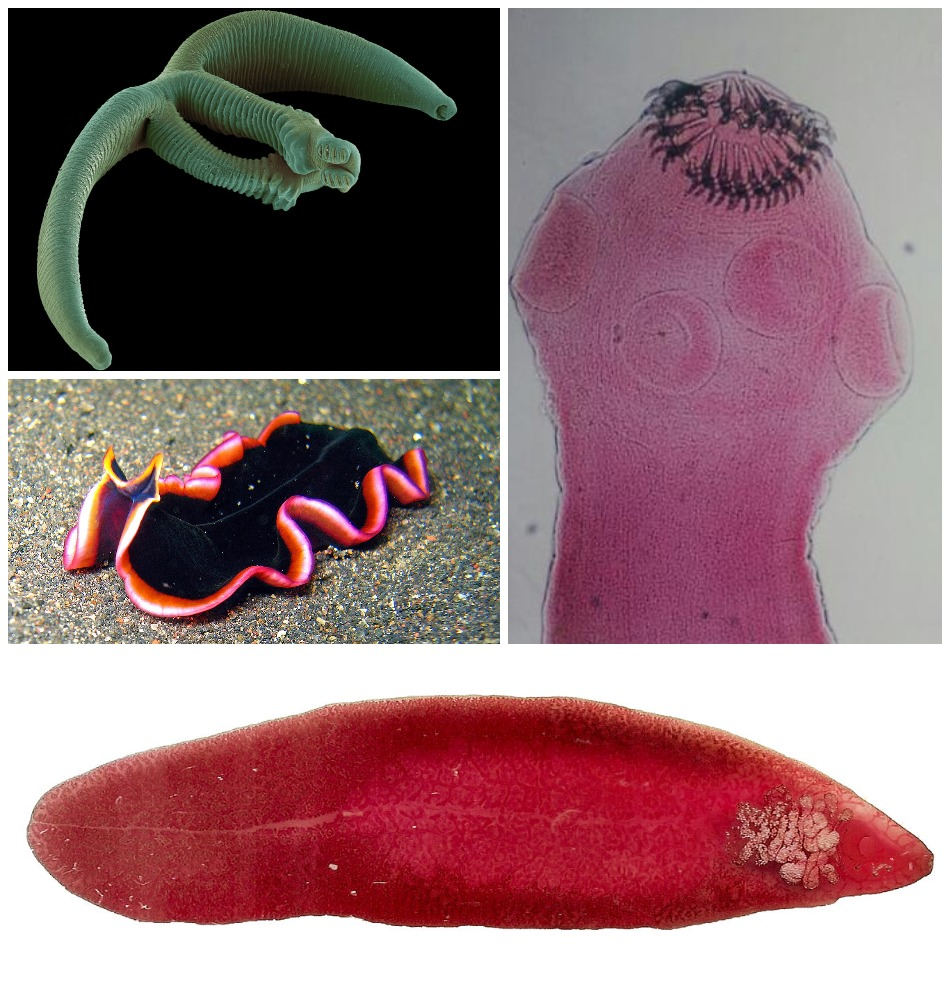
- In a clockwise spiral, starting from top left: Eudiplozoon nipponicum (monogeneans), pork tapeworm (tapeworms), common liver fluke (trematodes), Pseudobiceros hancockanus (Turbellaria)

Scientific classification
- Kingdom: Animalia
- Subkingdom: Eumetazoa
- Clade: ParaHoxozoa
- Clade: Bilateria
- Clade: Nephrozoa
- Clade: Protostomia
- Clade: Spiralia
- Clade: Rouphozoa
- Phylum: Platyhelminthes; Claus, 1887

Classes
- Traditional: Turbellaria; Trematoda; Monogenea; Cestoda; Phylogenetic: Catenulida; Rhabditophora

Synonyms
- Plathelminthes Schneider, 1873

= Flatworm =

Flatworm Temporal range: Permian–Present, 270–0 Ma Possible Cambrian, Ordovician and Devonian records

Phylum of soft-bodied invertebrates

Platyhelminthes (from Ancient Greek πλατύ (platy) 'flat' and ἕλμινς (helmins) 'parasitic worm') is a phylum of relatively simple bilaterian, unsegmented, soft-bodied invertebrates commonly called flatworms or flat worms. Being acoelomates (having no body cavity), and having no specialised circulatory and respiratory organs, they are restricted to having flattened shapes that allow oxygen and nutrients to pass through their bodies by diffusion. The digestive cavity has only one opening for both ingestion (intake of nutrients) and egestion (removal of undigested wastes); as a result, the food can not be processed continuously.

In traditional medicinal texts, Platyhelminthes are divided into Turbellaria, which are mostly non-parasitic animals such as planarians, and three entirely parasitic groups: Cestoda, Trematoda and Monogenea. However, since the turbellarians have since been proven not to be monophyletic, this classification is now deprecated. Free-living flatworms are mostly predators, and live in water or in shaded, humid terrestrial environments, such as leaf litter. Cestodes (tapeworms) and trematodes (flukes) have complex life-cycles, with mature stages that live as parasites in the digestive systems of fish or land vertebrates, and intermediate stages that infest secondary hosts. The eggs of trematodes are excreted from their main hosts, whereas adult cestodes generate vast numbers of hermaphroditic, segment-like proglottids that detach when mature, are excreted, and then release eggs. Unlike the other parasitic groups, the monogeneans are external parasites infesting aquatic animals, and their larvae metamorphose into the adult form after attaching to a suitable host.

Because they do not have internal body cavities, Platyhelminthes have historically been regarded as a primitive stage in the evolution of bilaterians (animals with bilateral symmetry and hence distinct front and rear ends). However, analyses since the mid-1980s have separated out one subgroup, the Acoelomorpha, as basal bilaterians – closer to the original bilaterians than to any other modern groups. The remaining Platyhelminthes form a monophyletic group, one that contains all and only descendants of a common ancestor that is itself a member of the group. The redefined Platyhelminthes is part of the Spiralia, one of the two main groups of Protostomia. These analyses concluded that the redefined Platyhelminthes, excluding Acoelomorpha, consists of two monophyletic subgroups, Catenulida and Rhabditophora, with Cestoda, Trematoda and Monogenea forming a monophyletic subgroup within one branch of the Rhabditophora. Hence, the traditional platyhelminth subgroup "Turbellaria" is now regarded as paraphyletic, since it excludes the wholly parasitic groups, although these are descended from one group of "turbellarians".

A planarian species has been used in the Philippines and the Maldives in an attempt to control populations of the imported giant African snail (Achatina fulica), which was eating agricultural crops. Success was initially reported for the Maldives but this was only temporary and the role of flatworms has been questioned. These planarians have now spread very widely throughout the tropics and are themselves a serious threat to native snails. As such, they should not be used for biological control. In Northwestern Europe, there are concerns about the spread of the New Zealand planarian Arthurdendyus triangulatus, which preys on earthworms.

== Description ==
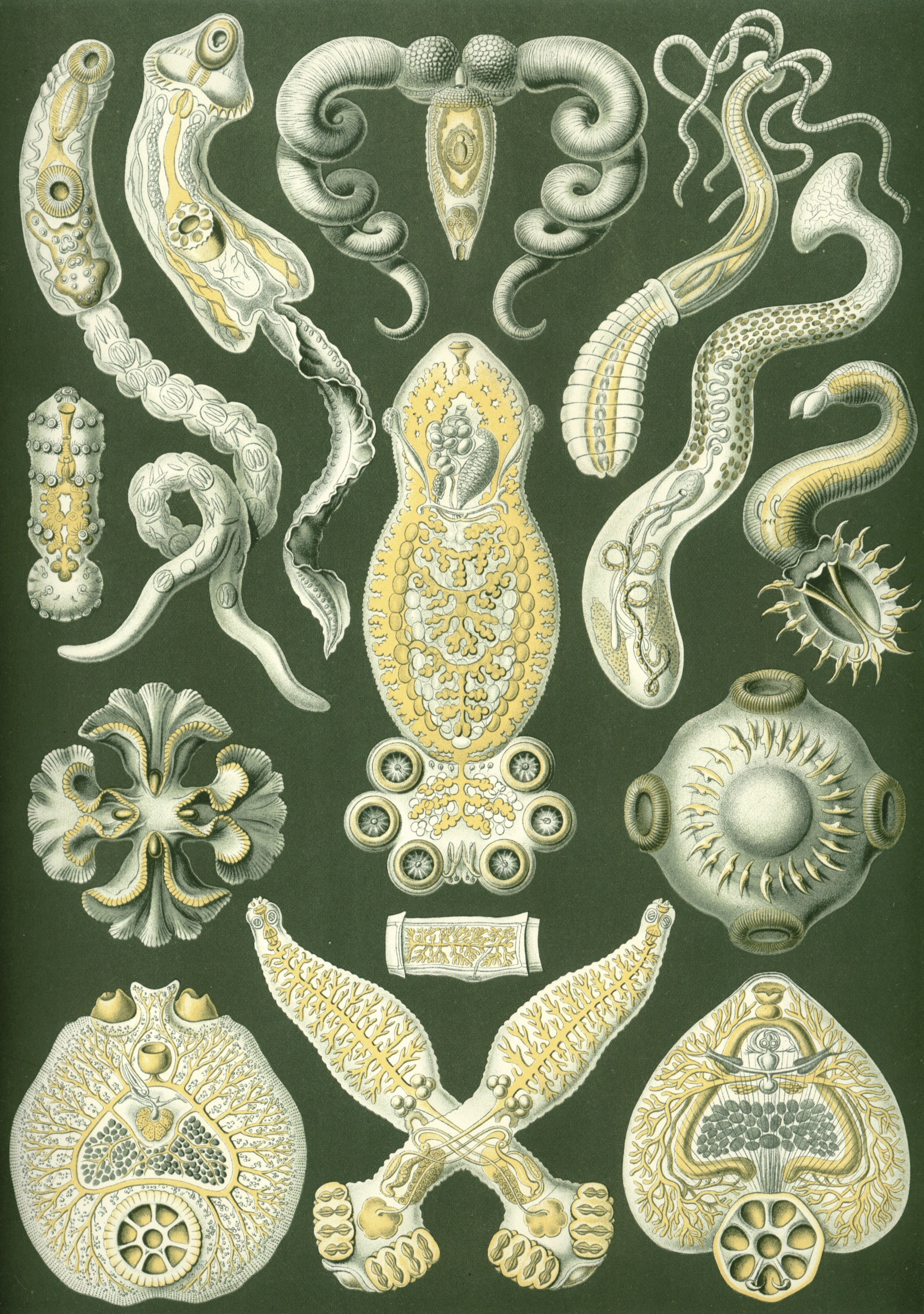
Various parasitic flatworms from Haeckel's Kunstformen der Natur (1904)

=== Distinguishing features ===
Platyhelminthes are bilaterally symmetrical animals: their left and right sides are mirror images of each other. This also implies that they have distinct top and bottom surfaces and distinct head and tail ends. Like other bilaterians, they have three main cell layers (endoderm, mesoderm, and ectoderm), while the radially symmetrical cnidarians and ctenophores (comb jellies) have only two cell layers. Beyond that, they are "defined more by what they do not have than by any particular series of specializations." Unlike most other bilaterians, Platyhelminthes have no internal body cavity, so are described as acoelomates, although the absence of a coelom also occurs in other bilaterians such as gnathostomulids, gastrotrichs, xenacoelomorphs, cycliophorans, entoprocts and the parasitic mesozoans. They also lack specialized circulatory and respiratory organs, both which are defining features when classifying a flatworm's anatomy. Their bodies are soft and unsegmented.

| Attribute | Cnidarians and Ctenophores | Platyhelminthes (flatworms) | More "advanced" bilaterians |
|---|---|---|---|
| Bilateral symmetry | No | Yes | |
| Number of main cell layers | Two, with jelly-like layer between them (mesoglea) | Three | |
| Distinct brain | No | Yes | |
| Specialized digestive system | No | Yes | |
| Specialized excretory system | No | Yes | |
| Body cavity containing internal organs | No | | Yes |
| Specialized circulatory and respiratory organs | No | | Yes |

=== Features common to all subgroups ===
The lack of circulatory and respiratory organs limits platyhelminths to sizes and shapes that enable oxygen to reach, and carbon dioxide to leave, all parts of their bodies by simple diffusion. Hence, many are microscopic, and the large species have flat ribbon-like or leaf-like shapes. Because there is no circulatory system which can transport nutrients around, the guts of large species have many branches, allowing the nutrients to diffuse to all parts of the body. Respiration through the whole surface of the body makes them vulnerable to fluid loss, and restricts them to environments where dehydration is unlikely: sea and freshwater, moist terrestrial environments such as leaf litter or between grains of soil, and as parasites within other animals.

The space between the skin and gut is filled with mesenchyme, also known as parenchyma, a connective tissue made of cells and reinforced by collagen fibers that act as a type of skeleton, providing attachment points for muscles. The mesenchyme contains all the internal organs and allows the passage of oxygen, nutrients and waste products. It consists of two main types of cell: fixed cells, some of which have fluid-filled vacuoles; and stem cells, which can transform into any other type of cell, and are used in regenerating tissues after injury or asexual reproduction.

Most platyhelminths have no anus and regurgitate undigested material through the mouth. The genus Paracatenula, whose members include tiny flatworms living in symbiosis with bacteria, is even missing a mouth and a gut. However, some long species have an anus and some with complex, branched guts have more than one anus, since excretion only through the mouth would be difficult for them. The gut is lined with a single layer of endodermal cells that absorb and digest food. Some species break up and soften food first by secreting enzymes in the gut or pharynx (throat).

All animals need to keep the concentration of dissolved substances in their body fluids at a fairly constant level. Internal parasites and free-living marine animals live in environments with high concentrations of dissolved material, and generally let their tissues have the same level of concentration as the environment, while freshwater animals need to prevent their body fluids from becoming too dilute. Despite this difference in environments, most platyhelminths use the same system to control the concentration of their body fluids. Flame cells, so called because the beating of their flagella looks like a flickering candle flame, extract from the mesenchyme water that contains wastes and some reusable material, and drive it into networks of tube cells which are lined with flagella and microvilli. The tube cells' flagella drive the water towards exits called nephridiopores, while their microvilli reabsorb reusable materials and as much water as is needed to keep the body fluids at the right concentration. These combinations of flame cells and tube cells are called protonephridia.

In all platyhelminths, the nervous system is concentrated at the head end. Other platyhelminths have rings of ganglia in the head and main nerve trunks running along their bodies.

== Major subgroups ==
Early classification divided the flatworms into four groups: Turbellaria, Trematoda, Monogenea and Cestoda. This classification has long been recognized to be artificial and, in 1985, Ehlers proposed a phylogenetically more correct classification, where the massively polyphyletic "Turbellaria" was split into a dozen orders, and Trematoda, Monogenea and Cestoda were joined in the new order Neodermata. However, the classification presented here is the early, traditional, classification, as it still is the one used everywhere except in scientific articles.

=== Turbellaria ===
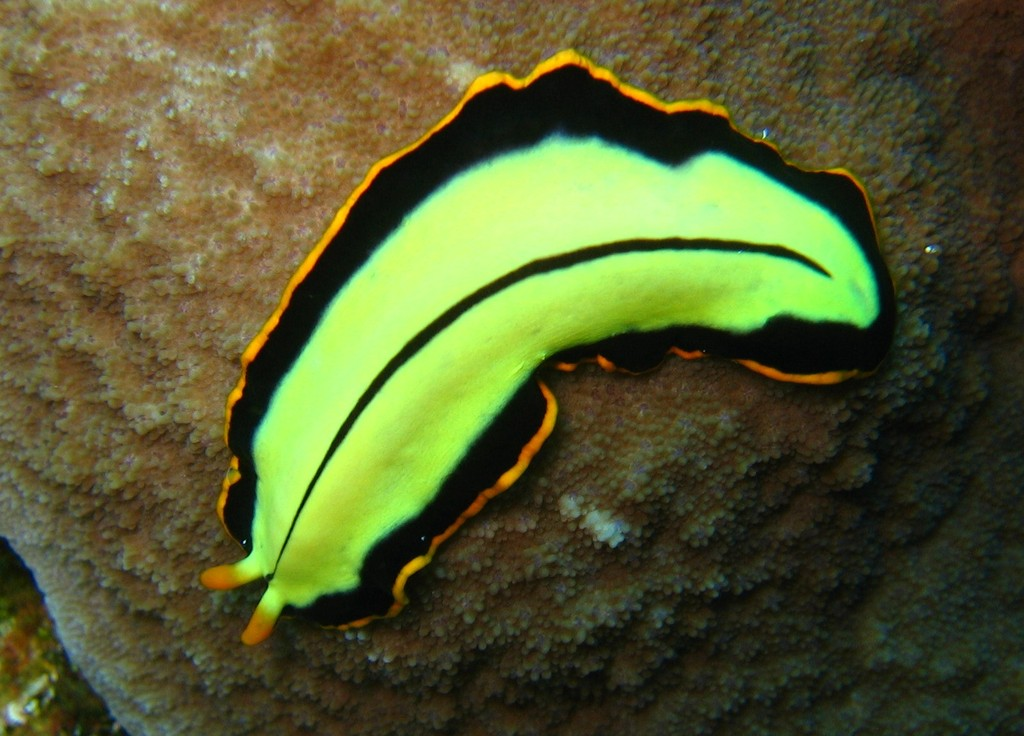
The turbellarian Pseudoceros dimidiatus

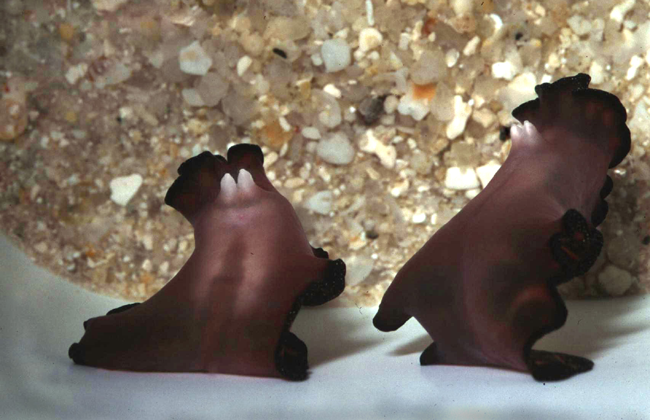
Two turbellarians are mating by penis fencing. Each has two penises, the white spikes on the undersides of their heads.

These have about 4,500 species, are mostly free-living, and range from 1 mm (0.04 in) to 600 mm (24 in) in length. Most are predators or scavengers, and terrestrial species are mostly nocturnal and live in shaded, humid locations, such as leaf litter or rotting wood. However, some are symbiotes of other animals, such as crustaceans, and some are parasites. Free-living turbellarians are mostly black, brown or gray, but some larger ones are brightly colored. The Acoela and Nemertodermatida were traditionally regarded as turbellarians, but are now regarded as members of a separate phylum, the Acoelomorpha, or as two separate phyla. Xenoturbella, a genus of very simple animals, has also been reclassified as a separate phylum.

Some turbellarians have a simple pharynx lined with cilia and generally feed by using cilia to sweep food particles and small prey into their mouths, which are usually in the middle of their undersides. Most other turbellarians have a pharynx that is eversible (can be extended by being turned inside-out), and the mouths of different species can be anywhere along the underside. The freshwater species Microstomum caudatum can open its mouth almost as wide as its body is long, to swallow prey about as large as itself. Predatory species in suborder Kalyptorhynchia often have a muscular pharynx equipped with hooks or teeth used for seizing prey.

Most turbellarians have pigment-cup ocelli ('little eyes'). Most species have one pair, but others can have two or even three pairs. A few large species have many eyes in clusters over the brain, mounted on tentacles, or spaced uniformly around the edge of the body. The ocelli can only distinguish the direction from which light is coming to enable the animals to avoid it. A few groups have statocysts – fluid-filled chambers containing a small, solid particle or, in a few groups, two. These statocysts are thought to function as balance and acceleration sensors, as they perform the same way in cnidarian medusae and in ctenophores. However, turbellarian statocysts have no sensory cilia, so the way they sense the movements and positions of solid particles is unknown. On the other hand, most have ciliated touch-sensor cells scattered over their bodies, especially on tentacles and around the edges. Specialized cells in pits or grooves on the head are most likely smell sensors.

Planarians, a subgroup of seriates, are famous for their ability to regenerate if divided by cuts across their bodies. Experiments show that, on fragments that do not already have a head, a new head grows most quickly on those fragments which were originally located closest to the original head. This suggests that the growth of a head is controlled by a chemical whose concentration diminishes throughout the organism, from head to tail. Many turbellarians clone themselves by transverse or longitudinal division, whilst others reproduce by budding.

The vast majority of turbellarians are hermaphrodites (they have both female and male reproductive cells) which fertilize eggs internally by copulation. Some of the larger aquatic species mate by penis fencing – a duel in which each tries to impregnate the other, and the loser adopts the female role of developing the eggs. In most species, "miniature adults" emerge when the eggs hatch, but a few large species produce plankton-like larvae.

=== Trematoda ===
These parasites' name refers to the cavities in their holdfasts (from Ancient Greek τρῆμα (trêma) 'hole'), which resemble suckers and anchor them within their hosts. The skin of all species is a syncitium, a layer of cells that shares a single external membrane. Trematodes are divided into two groups, Digenea and Aspidogastrea (also known as Aspodibothrea).

==== Digenea ====
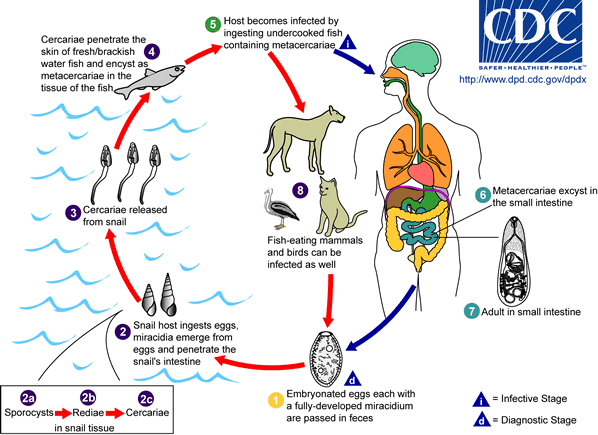
Life cycle of the digenean Metagonimus

These are often called flukes, as most have flat rhomboid shapes like that of a flounder (from Old English flóc). There are about 11,000 species, more than all other platyhelminthes combined, and second only to roundworms among parasites on metazoans. Adults usually have two holdfasts: a ring around the mouth and a larger sucker midway along what would be the underside in a free-living flatworm. Although the name "Digeneans" means "two generations", most have very complex life cycles with up to seven stages, depending on what combinations of environments the early stages encounter – the most important factor being whether the eggs are deposited on land or in water. The intermediate stages transfer the parasites from one host to another. The definitive host in which adults develop is a land vertebrate; the earliest host of juvenile stages is usually a snail that may live on land or in water, whilst in many cases, a fish or arthropod is the second host. For example, the adjoining illustration shows the life cycle of the intestinal fluke metagonimus, which hatches in the intestine of a snail, then moves to a fish where it penetrates the body and encysts in the flesh, then migrates to the small intestine of a land animal that eats the fish raw, and finally generates eggs that are excreted and ingested by snails, thereby completing the cycle. A similar life cycle occurs with Opisthorchis viverrini, which is found in South East Asia and can infect the liver of humans, causing cholangiocarcinoma (bile duct cancer). Schistosomes, which cause the devastating tropical disease bilharzia, also belong to this group.

Adults range between 0.2 mm (0.0079 in) and 6 mm (0.24 in) in length. Individual adult digeneans are of a single sex, and in some species slender females live in enclosed grooves that run along the bodies of the males, partially emerging to lay eggs. In all species the adults have complex reproductive systems, capable of producing between 10,000 and 100,000 times as many eggs as a free-living flatworm. In addition, the intermediate stages that live in snails reproduce asexually.

Adults of different species infest different parts of the definitive host - for example the intestine, lungs, large blood vessels, and liver. The adults use a relatively large, muscular pharynx to ingest cells, cell fragments, mucus, body fluids or blood. In both the adult and snail-inhabiting stages, the external syncytium absorbs dissolved nutrients from the host. Adult digeneans can live without oxygen for long periods.

==== Aspidogastrea ====
Members of this small group have either a single divided sucker or a row of suckers that cover the underside. They infest the guts of bony or cartilaginous fish, turtles, or the body cavities of marine and freshwater bivalves and gastropods. Their eggs produce ciliated swimming larvae, and the life cycle has one or two hosts.

=== Cercomeromorpha ===
Cercomeromorpha contains parasites that attach themselves to their hosts by means of disks that bear crescent-shaped hooks. They are divided into Monogenea and Cestoda.

==== Monogenea ====
Silhouettes of bodies of various polyopisthocotylean Monogeneans

Most of the roughly 1,100 species of monogeneans are external parasites that require particular host species - mainly fish, but in some cases amphibians or aquatic reptiles. However, a few are internal parasites. Adult monogeneans have large attachment organs at the rear, known as haptors (from Ancient Greek ἅπτειν (haptein) 'catch'), which have suckers, clamps, and hooks. They often have flattened bodies. In some species, the pharynx secretes enzymes to digest the host's skin, allowing the parasite to feed on blood and cellular debris. Others graze externally on mucus and flakes of the hosts' skins. The name "Monogenea" is based on the fact that these parasites have only one nonlarval generation.

==== Cestoda ====
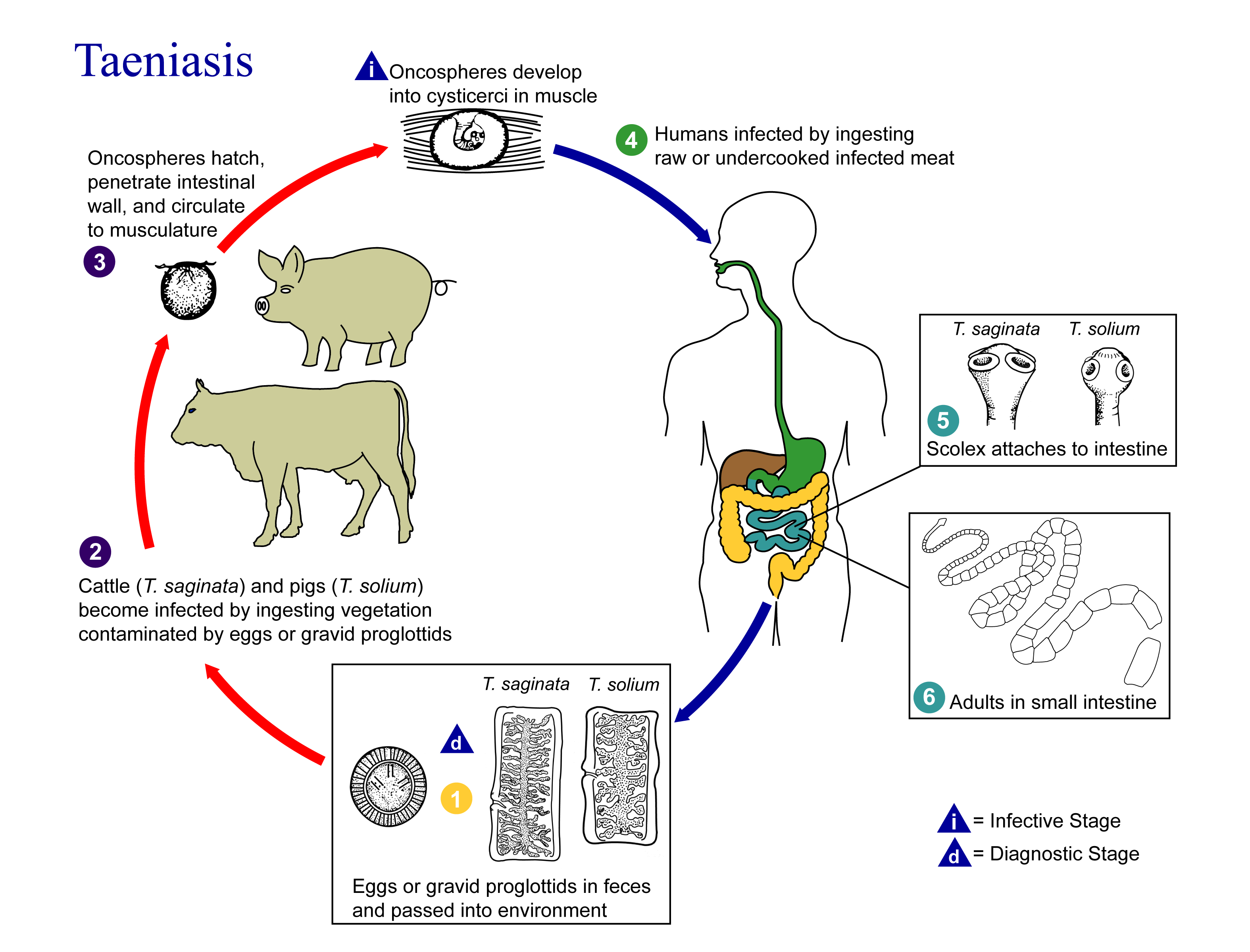
Life cycle of the eucestode Taenia: Inset 5 shows the scolex, which has four Taenia solium, a disk with hooks on the end. Inset 6 shows the tapeworm's whole body, in which the scolex is the tiny, round tip in the top left corner, and a mature proglottid has just detached.

These are often called tapeworms because of their flat, slender but very long bodies – the name "cestode" is derived from the Latin word cestus, which means 'tape'. The adults of all 3,400 cestode species are internal parasites. Cestodes have no mouths or guts, and the syncitial skin absorbs nutrients – mainly carbohydrates and amino acids – from the host, and also disguises it chemically to avoid attacks by the host's immune system. Shortage of carbohydrates in the host's diet stunts the growth of parasites and may even kill them. Their metabolisms generally use simple but inefficient chemical processes, compensating for this inefficiency by consuming large amounts of food relative to their physical size.

In the majority of species, known as eucestoda ('true tapeworms'), the neck produces a chain of segments called proglottids via a process known as strobilation. As a result, the most mature proglottids are furthest from the scolex. Adults of Taenia saginata, which infests humans, can form proglottid chains over 20 metres (66 ft) long, although 4 metres (13 ft) is more typical. Each proglottid has both male and female reproductive organs. If the host's gut contains two or more adults of the same cestode species they generally fertilize each other, however, proglottids of the same worm can fertilize each other and even themselves. When the eggs are fully developed, the proglottids separate and are excreted by the host. The eucestode life cycle is less complex than that of digeneans, but varies depending on the species. For example:

- Adults of Diphyllobothrium infest fish, and the juveniles use copepod crustaceans as intermediate hosts. Excreted proglottids release their eggs into the water where the eggs hatch into ciliated, swimming larvae. If a larva is swallowed by a copepod, it sheds the cilia and the skin becomes a syncitium; the larva then makes its way into the copepod's hemocoel (an internal cavity which is the central part of the circulatory system) where it attaches itself using three small hooks. If the copepod is eaten by a fish, the larva metamorphoses into a small, unsegmented tapeworm, drills through to the gut and grows into an adult.
- Various species of Taenia infest the guts of humans, cats and dogs. The juveniles use herbivores – such as pigs, cattle and rabbits – as intermediate hosts. Excreted proglottids release eggs that stick to grass leaves and hatch after being swallowed by a herbivore. The larva then makes its way to the herbivore's muscle tissue, where it metamorphoses into an oval worm about 10 millimetres (0.39 in) long, with a scolex that is kept internally. When the definitive host eats infested raw or undercooked meat from an intermediate host, the worm's scolex pops out and attaches itself to the gut, when the adult tapeworm develops.

Members of the smaller group known as Cestodaria have no scolex, do not produce proglottids, and have body shapes similar to those of digeneans. Cestodarians parasitize fish and turtles.

== Classification and evolutionary relationships ==
The relationships of Platyhelminthes to other Bilateria are shown in the phylogenetic tree:

- Bilateria
  - Acoelomorpha
  - - Deuterostomia
    - Protostomia
      - Ecdysozoa
      - Spiralia
        - Gnathifera
        - Platytrochozoa 580 mya
          - Rouphozoa
            - Gastrotricha
            - 270 mya
              Platyhelminthes
          - Lophotrochozoa 550 mya
            - Mollusca
            - Annelida

The internal relationships of Platyhelminthes are shown below. The tree is not fully resolved.

- Platyhelminthes
  - Catenulida
  - Rhabditophora
    - Macrostomorpha
    - Trepaxonemata
      - Amplimatricata
        - Prorhynchida
        - Polycladida
      - - Gnosonesimida
        - Euneoophora
          - Rhabdocoela
            - Kalyptorhynchia
            - Dalytyphloplanida
          - - Proseriata
            - Acentrosomata
              - Adiaphanida
                - Prolecithophora
                - - Fecampiida
                  - Tricladida (planarians)
              - Bothrioneodermata
                - Bothrioplanata
                  Bothrioplanida (freshwater)
                - parasitic
                  Neodermata (flukes, tapeworms)

The oldest confidently identified parasitic flatworm fossils are cestode eggs found in a Permian shark coprolite, but helminth hooks still attached to Devonian acanthodians and placoderms might also represent parasitic flatworms with simple life cycles. The oldest known free-living platyhelminth specimen is a fossil preserved in Eocene age Baltic amber and placed in the monotypic species Micropalaeosoma balticus, whilst the oldest subfossil specimens are schistosome eggs discovered in ancient Egyptian mummies. The Platyhelminthes have very few synapomorphies - distinguishing features that all Platyhelminthes (but no other animals) exhibit. This makes it difficult to work out their relationships with other groups of animals, as well as the relationships between different groups that are described as members of the Platyhelminthes.

The "traditional" view before the 1990s was that Platyhelminthes formed the sister group to all the other bilaterians, which include, for instance, arthropods, molluscs, annelids and chordates. Since then, molecular phylogenetics, which aims to work out evolutionary "family trees" by comparing different organisms' biochemicals such as DNA, RNA and proteins, has radically changed scientists' view of evolutionary relationships between animals. Flatworms are now recognized as secondarily simplified bilaterians.

Detailed morphological analyses of anatomical features in the mid-1980s, as well as molecular phylogenetics analyses since 2000 using different sections of DNA, agree that Acoelomorpha, consisting of Acoela (traditionally regarded as very simple "turbellarians") and Nemertodermatida (another small group previously classified as "turbellarians") are the sister group to all other bilaterians. However, a 2007 study concluded that Acoela and Nemertodermatida were two distinct groups of bilaterians.

Xenoturbella, a bilaterian whose only well-defined organ is a statocyst, was originally classified as a "primitive turbellarian". Later studies suggested it may instead be a deuterostome, but more detailed molecular phylogenetics have led to its classification as sister-group to the Acoelomorpha.

The Platyhelminthes, excluding Acoelomorpha, contain two main groups – Catenulida and Rhabditophora – both of which are generally agreed to be monophyletic (each contains all and only the descendants of an ancestor that is a member of the same group). Early molecular phylogenetics analyses of the Catenulida and Rhabditophora left uncertainties about whether these could be combined in a single monophyletic group; a study in 2008 concluded that they could, therefore Platyhelminthes could be redefined as Catenulida plus Rhabditophora, excluding Acoelomorpha.

Other molecular phylogenetics analyses agree that the redefined Platyhelminthes are most closely related to Gastrotricha, and that both are part of a grouping known as Platyzoa. Platyzoa are generally agreed to be at least closely related to the Lophotrochozoa, a superphylum that includes molluscs and annelid worms. The majority view is that Platyzoa are part of Lophotrochozoa, but a significant minority of researchers regard Platyzoa as a sister group of Lophotrochozoa.

It has been agreed since 1985 that each of the wholly parasitic platyhelminth groups (Cestoda, Monogenea and Trematoda) is monophyletic, and that together these form a larger monophyletic grouping, the Neodermata, in which the adults of all members have syncytial skins. However, there is debate about whether the Cestoda and Monogenea can be combined as an intermediate monophyletic group, the Cercomeromorpha, within the Neodermata. It is generally agreed that the Neodermata are a sub-group a few levels down in the "family tree" of the Rhabditophora. Hence the traditional sub-phylum "Turbellaria" is paraphyletic, since it does not include the Neodermata although these are descendants of a sub-group of "turbellarians".

== Evolution ==
An outline of the origins of the parasitic lifestyle has been proposed. Epithelial feeding monopisthocotyleans on fish hosts are basal in the Neodermata and were the first shift to parasitism from free living ancestors. The next evolutionary step was a dietary change from epithelium to blood. The last common ancestor of Digenea + Cestoda was monogenean and most likely sanguinivorous.

In several members of the order Rhabdocoela, an endosymbiotic relationship with microalgae has evolved. Some species in the same order have also evolved kleptoplasty.

The earliest known fossils confidently classified as tapeworms have been dated to 270 million years ago, being found in coprolites (fossilised faeces) from an elasmobranch. Putative older fossils include a ribbon-shaped, bilaterally symmetrical organism named Rugosusivitta orthogonia from the Early Cambrian, found in China; brownish bodies on the bedding planes reported from the Late Ordovician (Katian) Vauréal Formation (Canada) by Knaust & Desrochers in 2019, tentatively interpreted as turbellarians, though the authors cautioned that they might ultimately turn out to be fossils of acoelomorphs or nemerteans; and circlets of fossil hooks preserved with placoderm and acanthodian fossils from the Devonian of Latvia, at least some of which might represent parasitic monogeneans.

== Interaction with humans ==
=== Parasitism ===
Magnetic resonance image of a patient with neurocysticercosis demonstrating multiple cysticerci of the pork tapeworm Taenia solium within the brain

Cestodes (tapeworms) and digeneans (flukes) cause diseases in humans and their livestock, whilst monogeneans can cause serious losses of stocks in fish farms. Schistosomiasis, also known as bilharzia or snail fever, is the second-most devastating parasitic disease in tropical countries, behind malaria. The Carter Center has estimated that 200 million people in 74 countries are infected with the disease, half of whom live in Africa. The condition has a low mortality rate, but usually presents as a chronic illness that can damage internal organs. It can impair the growth and cognitive development of children and increase the risk of bladder cancer in adults. The disease is caused by several flukes of the genus Schistosoma, which can bore through human skin; those most at risk use infected bodies of water for recreation or laundry.

In 2000, an estimated 45 million people were infected with the beef tapeworm Taenia saginata and 3 million with the pork tapeworm Taenia solium. Infection of the digestive system by adult tapeworms causes abdominal symptoms that, whilst unpleasant, are seldom disabling or life-threatening. However, neurocysticercosis resulting from penetration of T. solium larvae into the central nervous system is a major cause of acquired epilepsy worldwide. In 2000, about 39 million people were infected with trematodes (flukes) that naturally parasitize fish and crustaceans, but can pass to humans who eat raw or lightly cooked seafood. Infection of humans by the broad fish tapeworm Diphyllobothrium latum occasionally causes vitamin B_{12} deficiency and, in severe cases, megaloblastic anemia.

The threat to humans in developed countries is rising as a result of social trends: the increase in organic farming, which uses manure and sewage sludge rather than artificial fertilizers, spreads parasites both directly and via the droppings of seagulls which feed on manure and sludge; the increasing popularity of raw or lightly cooked foods; imports of meat, seafood and salad vegetables from high-risk areas; and, as an underlying cause, reduced awareness of parasites compared with other public health issues such as pollution. In less-developed countries, inadequate sanitation and the use of human feces (night soil) as fertilizer or to enrich fish farm ponds continues to spread parasitic platyhelminths, whilst poorly designed water-supply and irrigation projects have provided additional channels for their spread. People in these countries usually cannot afford the cost of fuel required to cook food thoroughly enough to kill parasites. Controlling parasites that infect humans and livestock has become more difficult, as many species have become resistant to drugs that used to be effective, mainly for killing juveniles in meat. While poorer countries still struggle with unintentional infection, cases have been reported of intentional infection in the US by dieters who are desperate for rapid weight-loss.

=== Pests ===
There is concern in northwest Europe (including the British Isles) regarding the possible proliferation of the New Zealand planarian Arthurdendyus triangulatus and the Australian flatworm Australoplana sanguinea, both of which prey on earthworms. A. triangulatus is thought to have reached Europe in containers of plants imported by botanical gardens.

=== Benefits ===
The planarian Platydemus manokwari has been deliberately released in an attempt to control of the giant African snail Achatina fulica which damages agricultural plants. It was first observed as an invasive species on Guam and was then released in the Philippines and Maldives. It has now spread to many islands in the Pacific and Caribbean and is now spreading across the Southern United States as well as southern and eastern Asia, including mainland China. It was initially claimed that P. manokwari severely reduced, and in places exterminated, A. fulica – achieving much greater success than most biological pest control programs, which generally aim for a low, stable population of the pest species. However, the decline of A. fulica is no longer thought to have been due to flatworm predation. These planarians are a serious threat to native snails and should never be used for biological control.

A study in Argentina shows the potential for planarians such as Girardia anceps, Mesostoma ehrenbergii, and Bothromesostoma evelinae to reduce populations of the mosquito species Aedes aegypti and Culex pipiens. The experiment showed that G. anceps can prey on all instars of both mosquito species, yet maintain a steady predation rate over time. The ability of these flatworms to live in artificial containers demonstrated the potential of placing these species in popular mosquito breeding sites, which might reduce the amount of mosquito-borne disease.

== See also ==
- Miracidium
- Regenerative medicine
- Schistosoma
