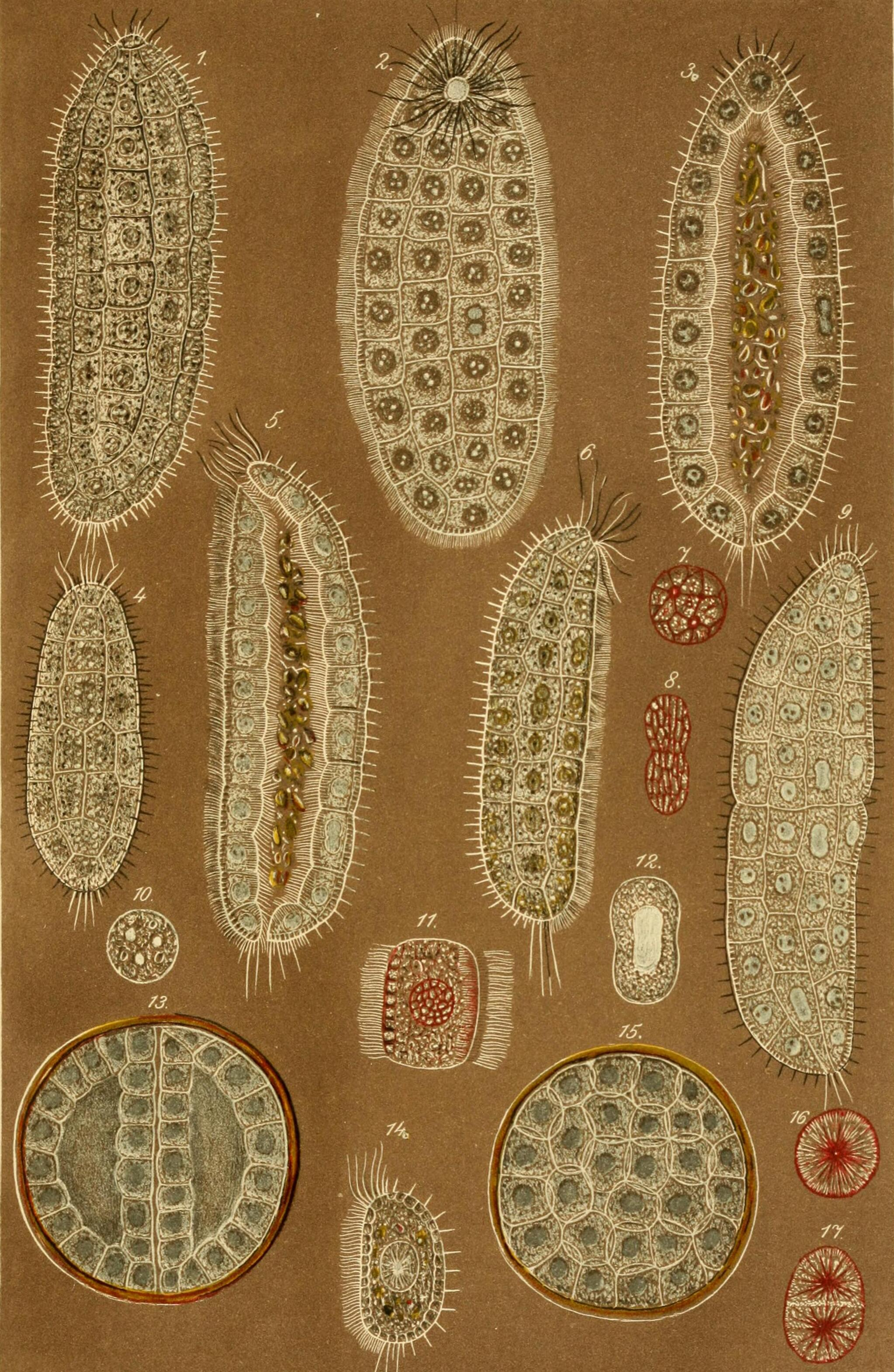
- Johannes Frenzel's illustrations, 1892

Scientific classification
- Kingdom: Animalia
- Phylum: Monoblastozoa; R. Blackwelder, 1963
- Genus: Salinella; J. Frenzel, 1891
- Species: S. salve

Binomial name
- Salinella salve J. Frenzel, 1892 nomen inquirendum

= Salinella =

Dubious species of simple animal

Salinella salve is a dubious species of a very simple animal which some have named as the sole member of the phylum Monoblastozoa. It was discovered in 1892 by Johannes Frenzel in the salt pans of Córdoba Province, Argentina and cultivated in a laboratory by him. This animal has not been found since and its real existence is considered as doubtful. A project involving Michael Schrödl from the Zoological State Collection in Munich searched for Salinella in salt lakes across Argentina and Chile, but failed to find any specimens.

== Discovery ==
Salinella was discovered in soil samples from salt pans around Río Cuarto, Córdoba Province, Argentina, although the exact type locality was never specified.

== Description ==
According to Frenzel's description, S. salve is more organized than Protozoa, but still very primitive for a multicellular organism. They are characterised by their distinct anterior/posterior parts and being densely ciliated, especially around the "mouth" and "anus". They have only one layer of cells, and reproduce asexually by transverse fission of their bodies. Although sexual reproduction was suspected, Frenzel did not observe it.

== See also ==
- Mesotardigrada – another high rank taxon whose sole member has not been independently verified to exist
