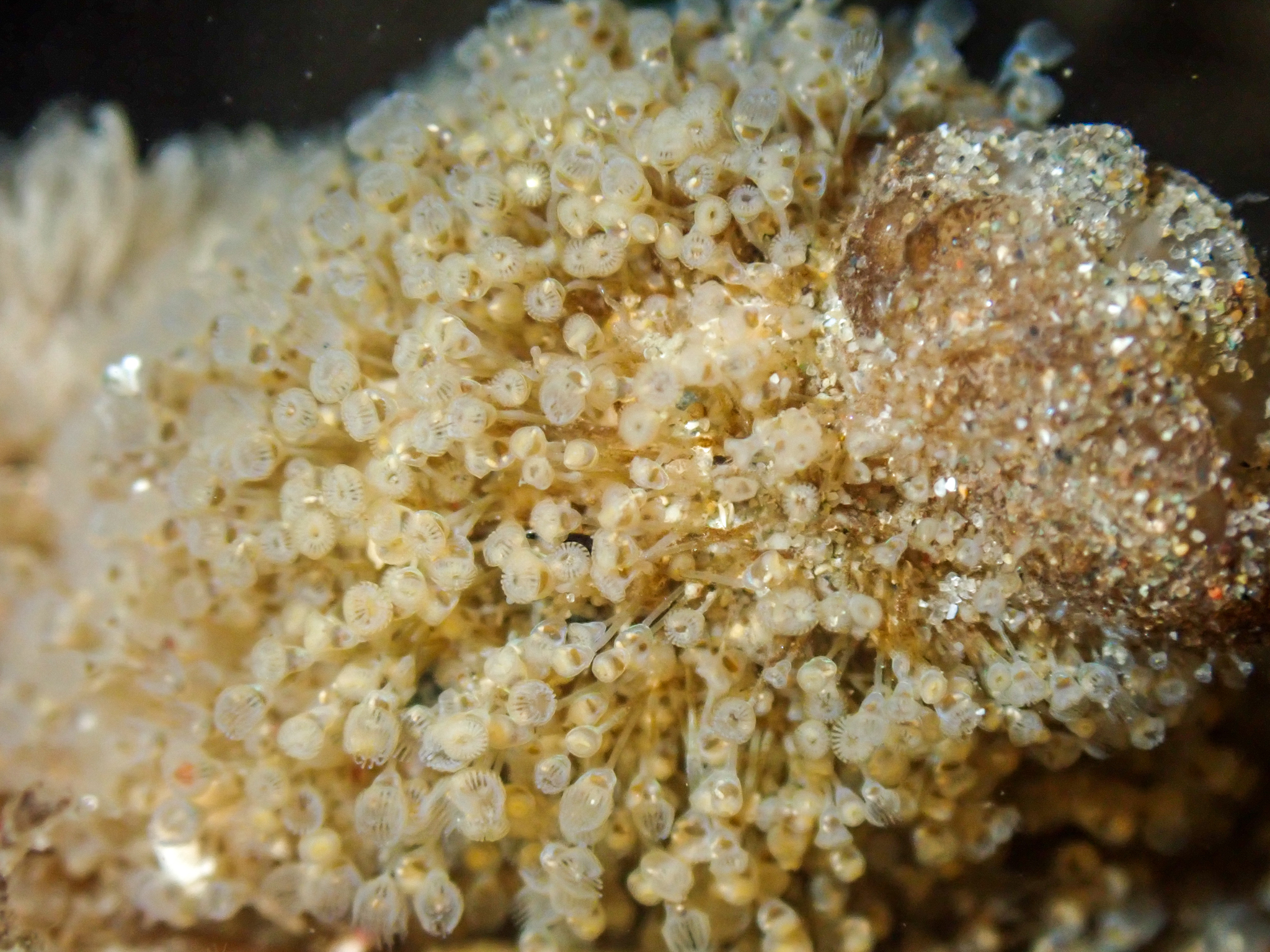
- Barentsia ramosa

Scientific classification
- Kingdom: Animalia
- Subkingdom: Eumetazoa
- Clade: ParaHoxozoa
- Clade: Bilateria
- Clade: Nephrozoa
- Clade: Protostomia
- Clade: Spiralia
- Superphylum: Lophotrochozoa
- Clade: Lophophorata
- Phylum: Entoprocta; Nitsche, 1870

Families
- Barentsiidae [incl. Urnatellidae p. p.]; Loxokalypodidae; Loxosomatidae; Pedicellinidae; incertae sedis; †Cotyledion

Synonyms
- Kamptozoa Cori, 1929

= Entoprocta =

Entoprocta Temporal range: Early Cambrian–Recent

Phylum of aquatic invertebrates

Entoprocta /ɛntoʊˈprɒktə/ (lit. 'inside rectum/anus'), or Kamptozoa /kæm(p)təˈzoʊə/, commonly called goblet worms, is a phylum of mostly-sessile aquatic animals, ranging from 0.1 to 7 millimetres (0.004 to 0.3 in) long. Mature individuals are goblet-shaped, on relatively long stalks. They have a "crown" of solid tentacles whose cilia generate water currents that draw food particles towards the mouth, and both the mouth and anus lie inside the "crown". The superficially similar Bryozoa (Ectoprocta) have the anus outside a "crown" of hollow tentacles. Most families of entoprocts are colonial, and all but 2 of the 150 species are marine. A few solitary species can move slowly.

Some species eject unfertilized ova into the water, while others keep their ova in brood chambers until they hatch, and some of these species use placenta-like organs to nourish the developing eggs. After hatching, the larvae swim for a short time and then settle on a surface. There they metamorphose, and the larval gut rotates by up to 180°, so that the mouth and anus face upwards. Both colonial and solitary species also reproduce by cloning — solitary species grow clones in the space between the tentacles and then release them when developed, while colonial ones produce new members from the stalks or from corridor-like stolons.

Fossils of entoprocts are very rare, and the earliest specimens that have been identified with confidence date from the Late Jurassic. Most studies from 1996 onwards have regarded entoprocts as members of the Trochozoa, which also includes molluscs and annelids. However, a study in 2008 concluded that entoprocts are closely related to bryozoans. Other studies place them in a clade Tetraneuralia, together with molluscs.

== Names ==
"Entoprocta", coined in 1870, means "anus inside". The alternative name "Kamptozoa", meaning "bent" or "curved" animals, was assigned in 1929. Some authors use "Entoprocta", while others prefer "Kamptozoa".

== Description ==
Most species are colonial, and their members are known as "zooids", since they are not fully independent animals. Zooids are typically 1 millimetre (0.039 in) long but range from 0.1 to 7 millimetres (0.004 to 0.3 in) long.

=== Distinguishing features ===
Entoprocts are superficially like bryozoans (ectoprocts), as both groups have a "crown" of tentacles whose cilia generate water currents that draw food particles towards the mouth. However, they have different feeding mechanisms and internal anatomy, and bryozoans undergo a metamorphosis from larva to adult that destroys most of the larval tissues; their colonies also have a founder zooid which is different from its "daughters".

Summary of distinguishing features
	Entoprocta	Bryozoa (Ectoprocta)
Tentacles	Solid	Hollow
Feeding current	From bases to tips of tentacles	From tips to bases of tentacles
Position of anus	Inside "crown" of tentacles	Outside "crown" of tentacles
Coelom	none	Three-part
Shape of founder zooid in a colony	Same as other zooids	Round, unlike normal zooids
Metamorphosis to adult	Retains most larval structures	Destroys most larval structures
Excretory organs	Protonephridia	None

=== Zooids ===
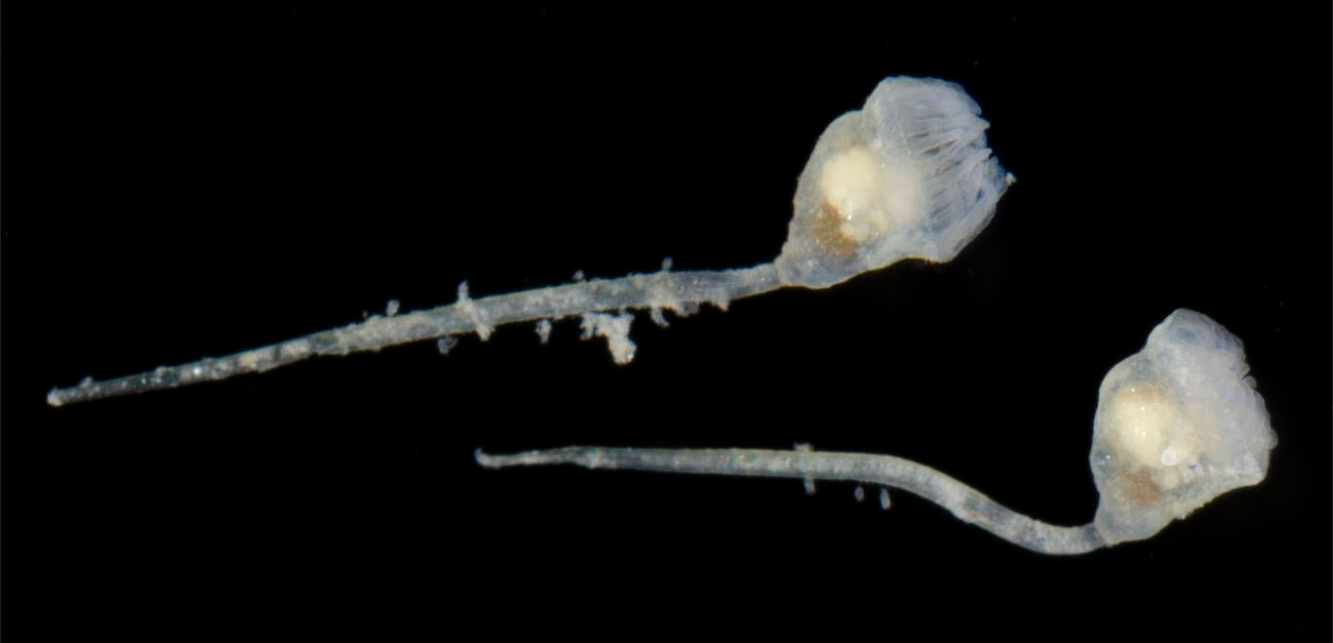
Barentsia laxa

The body of a mature entoproct zooid has a goblet-like structure with a calyx mounted on a relatively long stalk that attaches to a surface. The rim of the calyx bears a "crown" of 8 to 30 solid tentacles, which are extensions of the body wall. The base of the "crown" of tentacles is surrounded by a membrane that partially covers the tentacles when they retract. The mouth and anus lie on opposite sides of the atrium (space enclosed by the "crown" of tentacles), and both can be closed by sphincter muscles. The gut is U-shaped, curving down towards the base of the calyx, where it broadens to form the stomach. This is lined with a membrane consisting of a single layer of cells, each of which has multiple cilia.

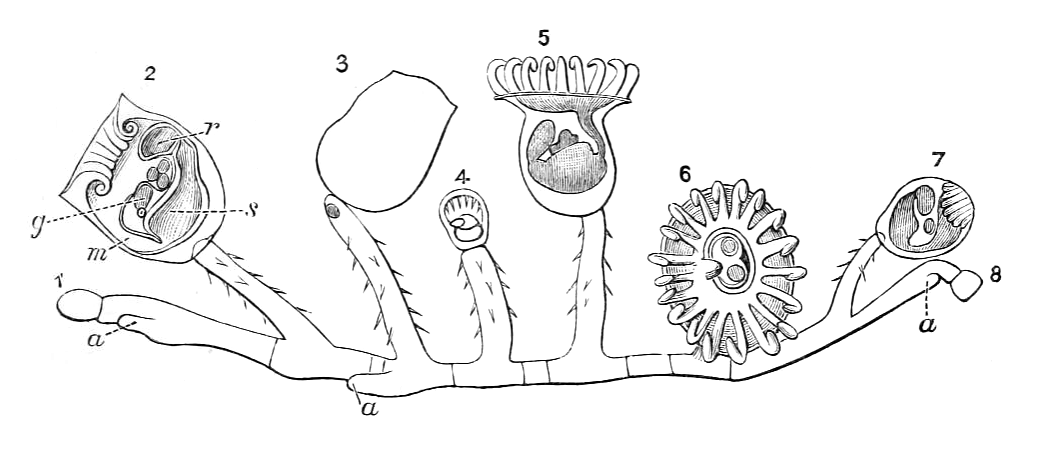
Pedicellina cernua (magnified x 27)

The stalks of colonial species arise from shared attachment plates or from a network of stolons, tubes that run across a surface. In solitary species, the stalk ends in a muscular sucker, or a flexible foot, or is cemented to a surface. The stalk is muscular and produces a characteristic nodding motion. In some species it is segmented. Some solitary species can move, either by creeping on the muscular foot or by somersaulting.

The body wall consists of the epidermis and an external cuticle, which consists mainly of criss-cross collagen fibers. The epidermis contains only a single layer of cells, each of which bears multiple cilia ("hairs") and microvilli (tiny "pleats") that penetrate through the cuticle. The stolons and stalks of colonial species have thicker cuticles, stiffened with chitin.

There is no coelom (internal fluid-filled cavity lined with peritoneum) and the other internal organs are embedded in connective tissue that lies between the stomach and the base of the "crown" of tentacles. The nervous system runs through the connective tissue and just below the epidermis, and is controlled by a pair of ganglia. Nerves run from these to the calyx, tentacles and stalk, and to sense organs in all these areas.

== Vegetative functions ==
A band of cells, each with multiple cilia, runs along the sides of the tentacles, connecting each tentacle to its neighbors, except that there is a gap in the band nearest the anus. A separate band of cilia grows along a groove that runs close to the inner side of the base of the "crown", with a narrow extension up the inner surface of each tentacle. The cilia on the sides of the tentacles create a current that flows into the "crown" at the bases of the tentacles and exits above the center of the "crown". These cilia pass food particles to the cilia on the inner surface of the tentacles, and the inner cilia produce a downward current that drives particles into and around the groove, and then to the mouth.

Entoprocts generally use one or both of: ciliary sieving, in which one band of cilia creates the feeding current and another traps food particles (the "sieve"); and downstream collecting, in which food particles are trapped as they are about to exit past them. In entoprocts, downstream collecting is carried out by the same bands of cilia that generate the current; trochozoan larvae also use downstream collecting, but use a separate set of cilia to trap food particles.

In addition, glands in the tentacles secrete sticky threads that capture large particles. A non-colonial species reported from around the Antarctic Peninsula in 1993 has cells that superficially resemble the cnidocytes of cnidaria, and fire sticky threads. These unusual cells lie around the mouth, and may provide an additional means of capturing prey.

The stomach and intestine are lined with microvilli, which are thought to absorb nutrients. The anus, which opens inside the "crown", ejects solid wastes into the outgoing current after the tentacles have filtered food out of the water; in some families it is raised on a cone above the level of the groove that conducts food to the mouth. Most species have a pair of protonephridia which extract soluble wastes from the internal fluids and eliminate them through pores near the mouth. However, the freshwater species Urnatella gracilis has multiple nephridia in the calyx and stalk.

The zooids absorb oxygen and emit carbon dioxide by diffusion, which works well for small animals.

== Reproduction and life cycle ==
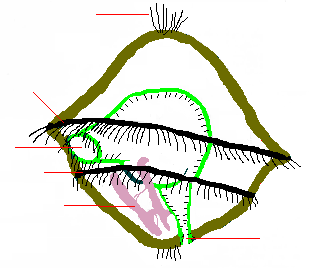
Trochophore larva

Most species are simultaneous hermaphrodites, but some switch from male to female as they mature, while individuals of some species remain of the same sex all their lives. Individuals have one or two pairs of gonads, placed between the atrium and stomach, and opening into a single gonopore in the atrium. The eggs are thought to be fertilized in the ovaries. Most species release eggs that hatch into planktonic larvae, but a few brood their eggs in the gonopore. Those that brood small eggs nourish them by a placenta-like organ, while larvae of species with larger eggs live on stored yolk. The development of the fertilized egg into a larva follows a typical spiralian pattern: the cells divide by spiral cleavage, and mesoderm develops from a specific cell labelled "4d" in the early embryo. There is no coelom at any stage.

In some species the larva is a trochophore which is planktonic and feeds on floating food particles by using the two bands of cilia round its "equator" to sweep food into the mouth, which uses more cilia to drive them into the stomach, which uses further cilia to expel undigested remains through the anus. In some species of the genera Loxosomella and Loxosoma, the larva produces one or two buds that separate and form new individuals, while the trochophore disintegrates. However, most produce a larva with sensory tufts at the top and front, a pair of pigment-cup ocelli ("little eyes"), a pair of protonephridia, and a large, cilia-bearing foot at the bottom. After settling, the foot and frontal tuft attach to the surface. Larvae of most species undergo a complex metamorphosis, and the internal organs may rotate by up to 180°, so that the mouth and anus both point upwards.

All species can produce clones by budding. Colonial species produce new zooids from the stolon or from the stalks, and can form large colonies in this way. In solitary species, clones form on the floor of the atrium, and are released when their organs are developed.

== Taxonomy ==
The phylum consists of about 150 recognized species, grouped into 4 families:

Family	Barentsiidae	Pedicellinidae	Loxokalypodidae	Loxosomatidae
Genera	Barentsia, Coriella, Pedicellinopsis, Pseudopedicellina, Urnatella	Chitaspis, Loxosomatoides, Myosoma, Pedicellina	Loxokalypus	Loxocorone, Loxomitra, Loxosoma, Loxosomella, Loxosomespilon
Colonial	Colonial			Solitary
Septum between calyx and stalk	Yes		No	
Star-cell organ	Yes		No	
Anus on cone	No		Yes	
Stolons present	Yes		No, colonies grow on shared baseplate	Not colonial
Segmented stems	Yes	No		

== Evolutionary history ==
=== Fossil record ===
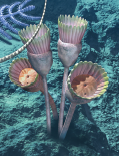
The Mid-Cambrian Dinomischus was once hailed as the earliest fossil entoproct, but the classification is uncertain

Since entoprocts are small and soft-bodied, fossils have been extremely rare. In 1977, Simon Conway Morris provided the first description of Dinomischus, a sessile animal with calyx, stalk and holdfast, found in Canada's Burgess Shale, which was formed about 505 million years ago. Conway Morris regarded this animal as the earliest known entoproct, since its mouth and anus lay inside a ring of structures above the calyx, but noted that these structures were flat and rather stiff, while the tentacles of modern entoprocts are flexible and have a round cross-section.

In 1992 J.A. Todd and P.D. Taylor concluded that Dinomischus was not an entoproct, because it did not have the typical rounded, flexible tentacles, and the fossils showed no other features that clearly resembled those of entoprocts. In their opinion, the earliest fossil entoprocts were specimens they found from Late Jurassic rocks in England. These resemble the modern colonial genus Barentsia in many ways, including: upright zooids linked by a network of stolons encrusting the surface to which the colony is attached; straight stalks joined to the stolons by bulky sockets with transverse bands of wrinkles; overall size and proportions similar to that of modern species of Barentsia.

Another species, Cotyledion tylodes, first described in 1999, was larger than extant entoprocts, reaching 8–56 mm in height, and unlike modern species, was "armored" with sclerites, scale-like structures. C. tylodes did have a similar sessile lifestyle to modern entoprocts. The identified fossils of C. tylodes were found in 520-million-year-old rocks from southern China. This places early entoprocts in the period of the Cambrian explosion.

=== Family tree ===
When entoprocts were discovered in the nineteenth century, they and bryozoans (ectoprocts) were regarded as classes within the phylum Bryozoa, because both groups were sessile animals that filter-fed by means of a "crown" of tentacles that bore cilia. However, from 1869 onwards, increasing awareness of differences, including the position of the entoproct anus inside the feeding structure and the difference in the early pattern of division of cells in their embryos, caused scientists to regard the two groups as separate phyla. "Bryozoa" then became just an alternative name for ectoprocts, in which the anus is outside the feeding organ. However, studies by one team in 2007 and 2008 argue for sinking Entoprocta into Bryozoa as a class, and resurrecting Ectoprocta as a name for the currently identified bryozoans.

The consensus of studies from 1996 onwards has been that entoprocts are part of the Trochozoa, a protostome "superphylum" whose members are united in having as their most basic larval form the trochophore type. The trochozoa also include molluscs, annelids, flatworms, nemertines and others. However, scientists disagree about which phylum is mostly closely related to entoprocts within the trochozoans. An analysis in 2008 re-introduced the pre-1869 meaning of the term "Bryozoa", for a group in which entoprocts and ectoprocts are each other's closest relatives.

== Ecology ==
=== Distribution and habitats ===
All species are sessile. While the great majority are marine, two species live in freshwater: Loxosomatoides sirindhornae, reported in 2004 in central Thailand, and Urnatella gracilis, found in all the continents except Antarctica. Colonial species are found in all the oceans, living on rocks, shells, algae and underwater buildings. The solitary species, which are marine, live on other animals that feed by producing water currents, such as sponges, ectoprocts and sessile annelids. The majority of species live no deeper than 50 meters, but a few species are found in the deep ocean.

=== Interaction with other organisms ===
Some species of nudibranchs ("sea slugs"), particularly those of the genus Trapania, as well as turbellarian flatworms, prey on entoprocts.

Small colonies of the freshwater entoproct Urnatella gracilis have been found living on the aquatic larvae of the dobsonfly Corydalus cornutus. The ectoprocts gain a means of dispersal, protection from predators and possibly a source of water that is rich in oxygen and nutrients, as colonies often live next to the gills of the larval flies. In the White Sea, the non-colonial entoproct Loxosomella nordgaardi prefers to live attached to bryozoan (ectoproct) colonies, mainly on the edges of colonies or in the "chimneys", gaps by which large bryozoan colonies expel water from which they have sieved food. Observation suggests that both the entoprocts and the bryozoans benefit from the association: each enhances the water flow that the other needs for feeding; and the longer cilia of the entoprocts may help them to capture different food from that caught by the bryozoans, so that the animals do not compete for the same food.

Entoprocts are small and have been little studied by zoologists. Hence it is difficult to determine whether a specimen belongs to a species that already occurs in the same area or is an invader, possibly as a result of human activities.
