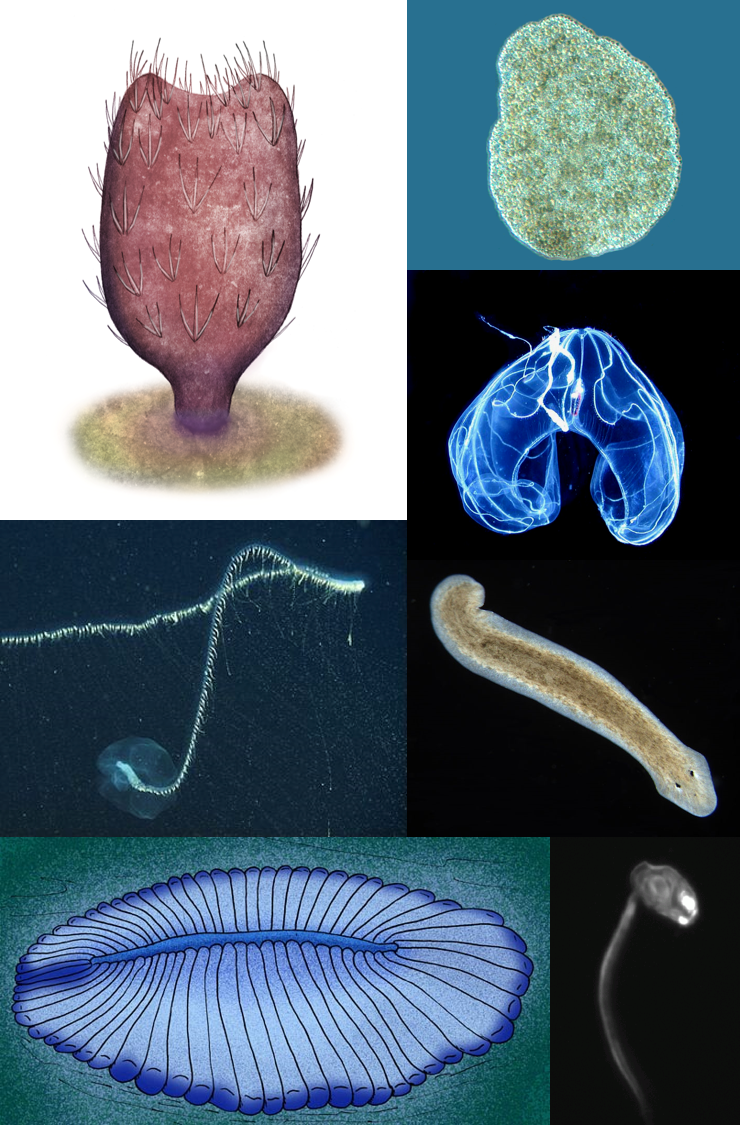

Scientific classification
- Kingdom: Animalia
- Subkingdom: Eumetazoa; Buetschli, 1910

Subdivisions
- †Petalonamae?; †Arboreomorpha?; †Rangeomorpha?; Ctenophora; †Chancelloriida; ParaHoxozoa; Placozoa?; Planulozoa; Cnidaria; Bilateria; †Proarticulata?; Xenacoelomorpha; Nephrozoa; †Trilobozoa?

Synonyms
- Enterozoa Lankester, 1877, em. Beklemishev; Epitheliozoa Ax, 1996; Histozoa Ulrich, 1950

= Eumetazoa =

Eumetazoa Temporal range: Ediacaran - Present 600–0 Ma

Basal animal clade as a sister group of the Porifera

Eumetazoa (from Ancient Greek εὖ (eû) 'well', μετά (metá) 'after' and ζῷον (zôion) 'animal'), also known as Epitheliozoa or Histozoa, is a proposed animal subkingdom as a sister group of the basal phylum Porifera (sponges), and is further divided into the more basal clade Ctenophora and the much larger group ParaHoxozoa, which include Cnidaria, Bilateria and Placozoa (the lattermost is now seen as a clade under ParaHoxozoa, based on genetic data). Eumetazoans contrast with poriferans in that they have more organized body plans with differentiated systems, presence of nerves or neuron-like excitable cells, and some clades, the ability of macroscopic motility.

The now-obsolete subkingdom Parazoa, which includes primarily Porifera, was previously designated as sister taxon to Eumetazoa. Agnothozoa were once considered an intermediary clade between Parazoa and Eumetazoa, being the sister clade to Parazoa which Eumetazoa would late derivate from. The group primarily encompassed the clade Placozoa and the proposed clade Mesozoa who groups Orthonectida, Dicyemida and the dubious Monoblastozoa, but now are largely considered a polyphyletic group of simplified eumetazoans. Though some archaic fossil groups such as Chancelloriidae and Petalonamae, may, based on weaker morphological evidence, still be considered members of intermediate clades before the crown group Eumetazoa.

The competing hypothesis is the Myriazoa clade, which states Ctenophora diverged earlier than Porifera, who instead would make up a clade with ParaHoxozoa, implying either sponges lost complexity or Ctenophores developed complexity independently, and maybe even a mix of both processes. As far as May 2026, this question remains unresolved and the dispute may became combative, with some scientists deciding not to participate in the debate.

Several other extinct or obscure life forms, such as Thectardis, may have emerged in the total group. Key characteristics present in most eumetazoans include true tissues organized into germ layers, the presence of neurons and muscles, and an embryo that goes through a gastrula stage.

Some phylogenists once speculated the sponges and eumetazoans evolved separately from different single-celled organisms, which would have meant that the animal kingdom does not form a clade (a complete grouping of all organisms descended from a common ancestor). However, genetic studies and some morphological characteristics, like the common presence of choanocytes, now unanimously support a common origin.

Traditionally, eumetazoans are a major group of animals in the Five Kingdoms classification of Lynn Margulis and K. V. Schwartz, comprising the Radiata and Bilateria – all animals except the sponges.

== Evolutionary origins ==
It has been suggested that one type of molecular clock and one approach to interpretation of the fossil record both place the evolutionary origins of eumetazoa in the Ediacaran. However, the earliest eumetazoans may not have left a clear impact on the fossil record and other interpretations of molecular clocks suggest the possibility of an earlier origin. The discoverers of Vernanimalcula describe it as the fossil of a bilateral triploblastic animal that appeared at the end of the Marinoan glaciation prior to the Ediacaran period, implying an even earlier origin for eumetazoans. Various ediacaran organisms have been tentatively classified as eumetazoans. But so far, very few Ediacaran organisms have been identified as definite eumetazoans like- Kimberella, Haootia and Dickinsonia. Ediacaran fossils preserve very little details so identifying one as an animal with true tissue is very difficult. Many extinct phyla have been proposed by many researchers that may fall under the clade. These are Proarticulata, Trilobozoa and Petalonamae. The inclusion of these within eumetazoa as well as the position of these within the clade is highly debated and sometimes considered speculative. The proarticulates are considered as stem bilaterians by most authors. Together the three phyla are sometimes grouped as the grade Vendobionta. The petalonamids are often considered as early diverging animals before animals with true tissue organisation started to appear.
