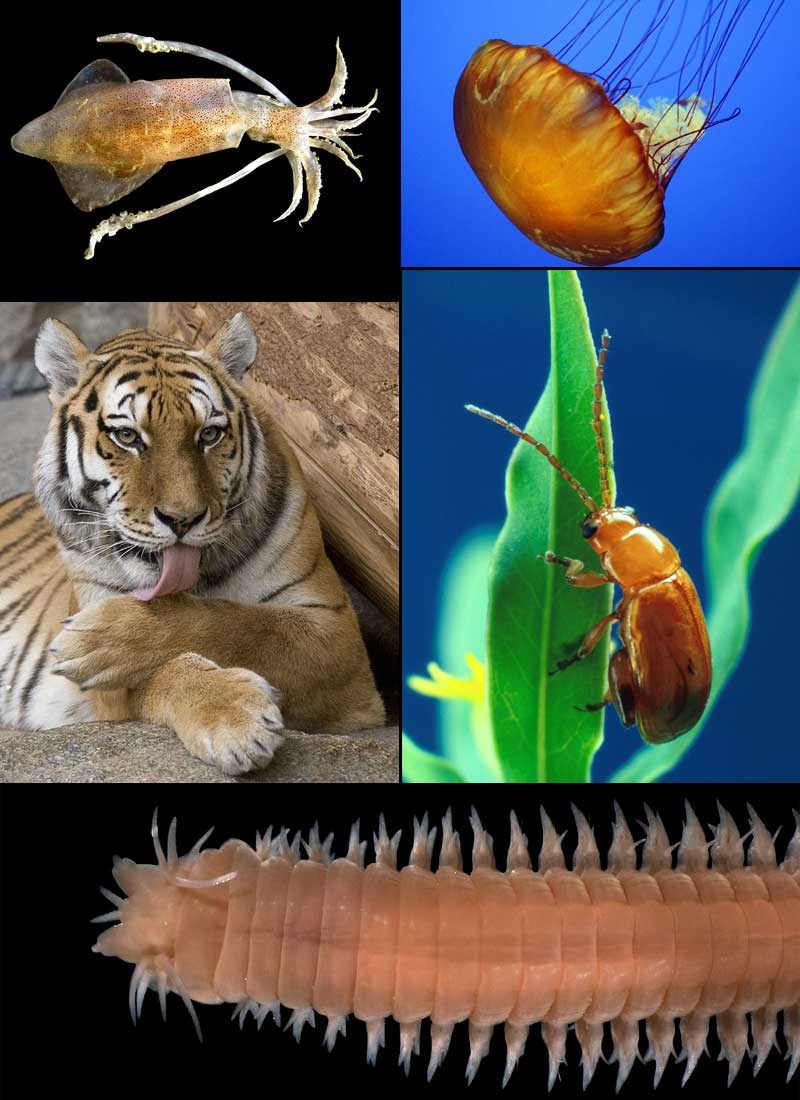
- Diversity of parahoxozoans

Scientific classification
- Kingdom: Animalia
- Subkingdom: Eumetazoa
- Clade: ParaHoxozoa; Ryan et al., 2010

Taxa
- Placozoa?; Planulozoa; Cnidaria; Bilateria

= ParaHoxozoa =

ParaHoxozoa Temporal range: 610–0 Ma Ediacaran-Present

Clade of all animals except sponges and comb jellies

ParaHoxozoa (or Parahoxozoa) is a clade of animals that consists of Bilateria, Placozoa, and Cnidaria.

== Phylogeny ==
The relationship of Parahoxozoa to the two other animal lineages Ctenophora and Porifera is debated. Some phylogenomic studies have presented evidence supporting Ctenophora as the sister to Parahoxozoa and Porifera as the sister group to the rest of animals (e.g.). Other studies have presented evidence supporting Porifera as the sister to Parahoxozoa and Ctenophora as the sister group to the rest of animals (e.g.), finding that nervous systems either evolved independently in ctenophores and parahoxozoans, or were secondarily lost in poriferans. If ctenophores are taken to have diverged first, Eumetazoa is sometimes used as a synonym for ParaHoxozoa.

The cladogram, which is congruent with the vast majority of these phylogenomic studies, conveys this uncertainty with a soft polytomy.

- Choanozoa
  - Choanoflagellata
  - Animalia
    - Ctenophora
    - Porifera
    - ParaHoxozoa
      - Placozoa
      - Planulozoa
        - Cnidaria
        - Bilateria

== ParaHoxozoa or Parahoxozoa ==
"ParaHox" genes are usually referred to in CamelCase and the original paper that named the clade used "ParaHoxozoa"; the single initial capital format "Parahoxozoa" has also come to be used in the literature.

== Characteristics ==
Parahoxozoa was defined by the presence of several gene (sub)classes (HNF, CUT, PROS, ZF, CERS, K50, S50-PRD), as well as Hox/ParaHox-ANTP from which the name of this clade originated. It was later proposed and contested that a gene of the same class (ANTP) as the Hox/ParaHox, the NK gene and the Cdx Parahox gene, is also present in Porifera, the sponges. Regardless of whether a ParaHox gene is ever definitively identified, Parahoxozoa, as originally defined, is monophyletic and therefore continues to be used as such.

== Planula-acoel, triploblasty, and bilaterian similarities ==
The original bilaterian is hypothesized to be a bottom dwelling worm with a single body opening. A through-gut may already have developed with the Ctenophora. The through-gut may have developed from the corners of a single opening with lips fusing. E.g. Acoela resemble the planula larvae of some Cnidaria, which exhibit some bilaterian symmetry. They are vermiform, just as the cnidarian Buddenbrockia is. Placozoans have been noted to resemble planula. Usually, "Planulozoa" is a Cnidaria–Bilateria clade that excludes Placozoa. Otherwise, when including all three lineages, it is synonymous with Parahoxozoa. Triploblasty may have developed before the Cnidaria–Bilateria radiation.
