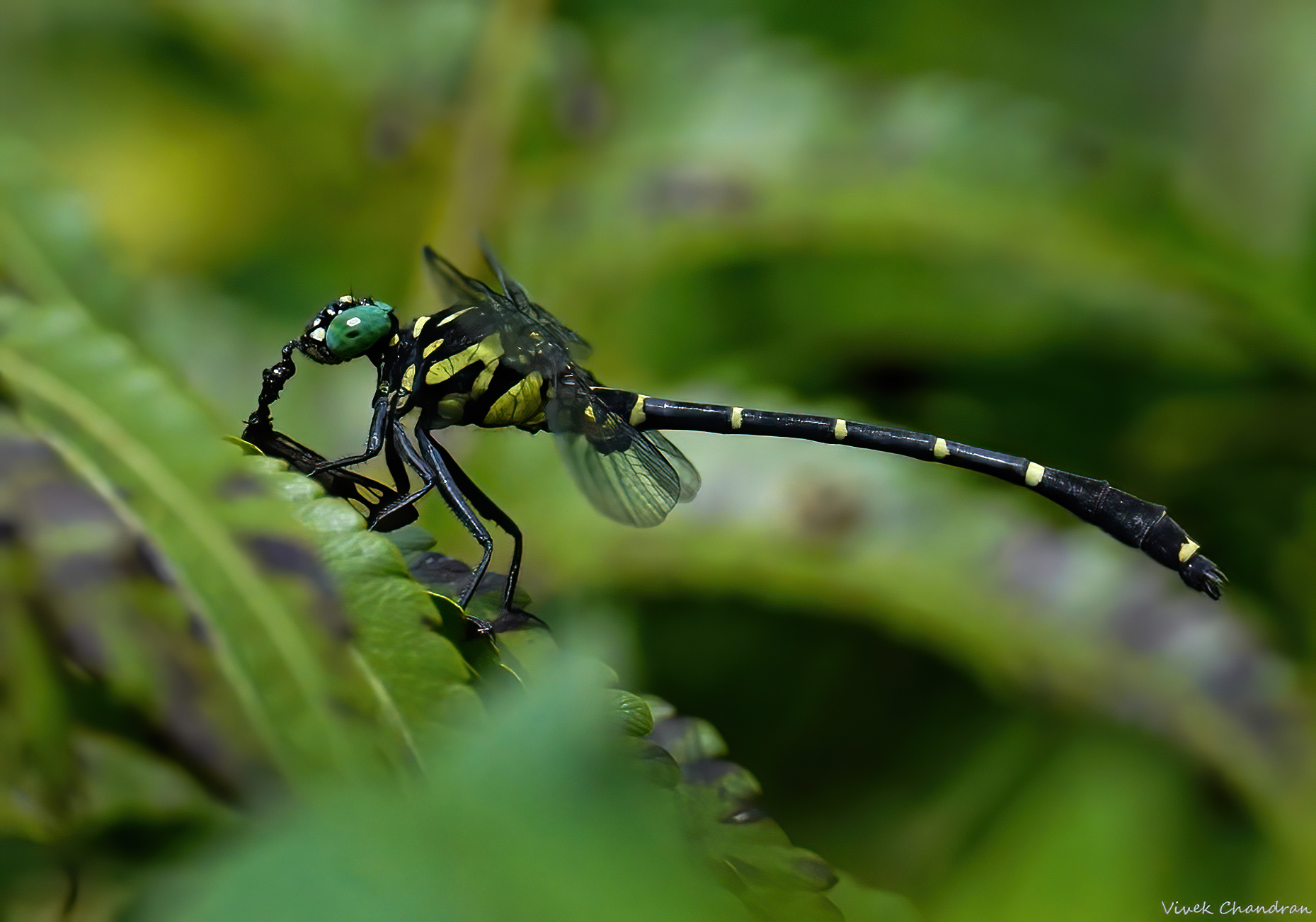
- Male
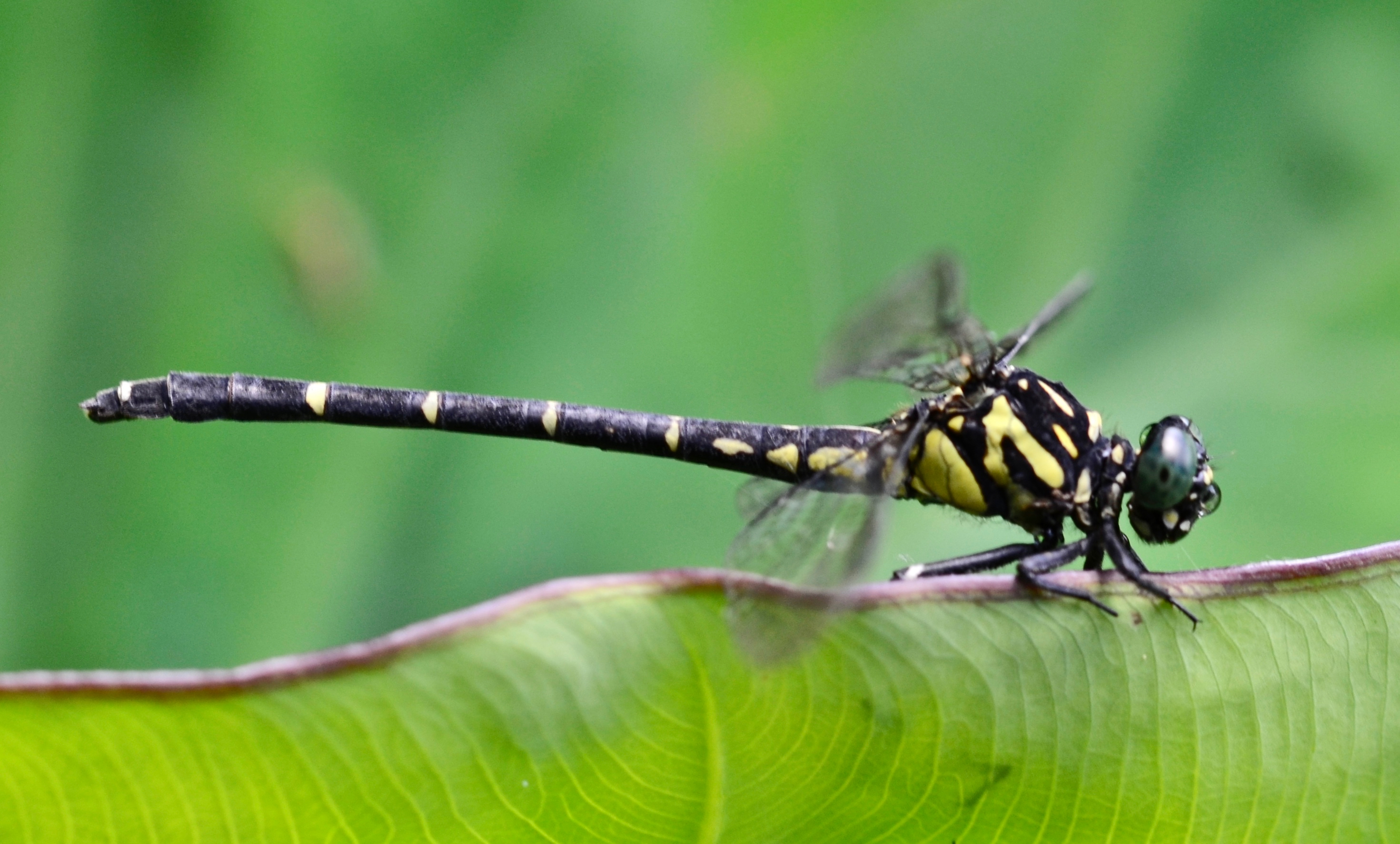
- Female

Conservation status
- Data Deficient (IUCN 3.1)

Scientific classification
- Kingdom: Animalia
- Phylum: Arthropoda
- Class: Insecta
- Order: Odonata
- Infraorder: Anisoptera
- Family: Gomphidae
- Genus: Burmagomphus
- Species: B. cauvericus

Binomial name
- Burmagomphus cauvericus Fraser, 1926

= Burmagomphus cauvericus =

Species of dragonfly

Burmagomphus cauvericus is a species of dragonfly in the family Gomphidae. It was earlier known only from the banks of Kaveri river in Kodagu district. It is recently recorded from Kerala too.

== Description and habitat ==
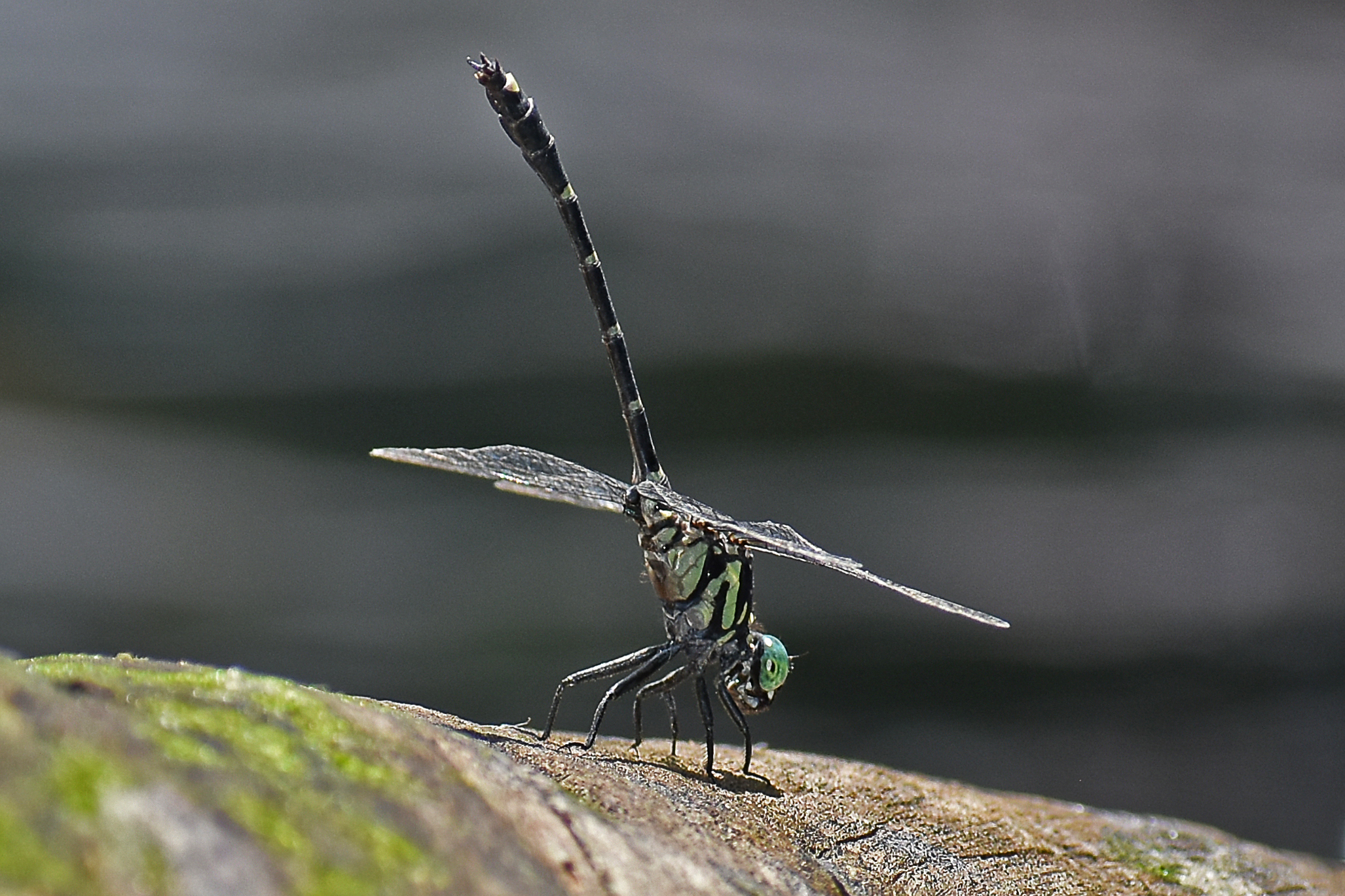
Burmagomphus cauvericus from Thodupuzha, Kerala

It is a medium-sized dragonfly with bottle-green eyes. Its thorax is black, marked with greenish-yellow stripes. The upper humeral spot is usually absent. Lateral markings on thorax are very similar to those of Burmagomphus pyramidalis; the stripe on the first suture is almost confluent to join the upper part of the stripe on the second suture. This species can be easily recognized by the anterior thoracic markings of Burmagomphus laidlawi with the lateral thoracic markings of Burmagomphus pyramidalis.

== See also ==
- List of odonates of India
- List of odonata of Kerala
