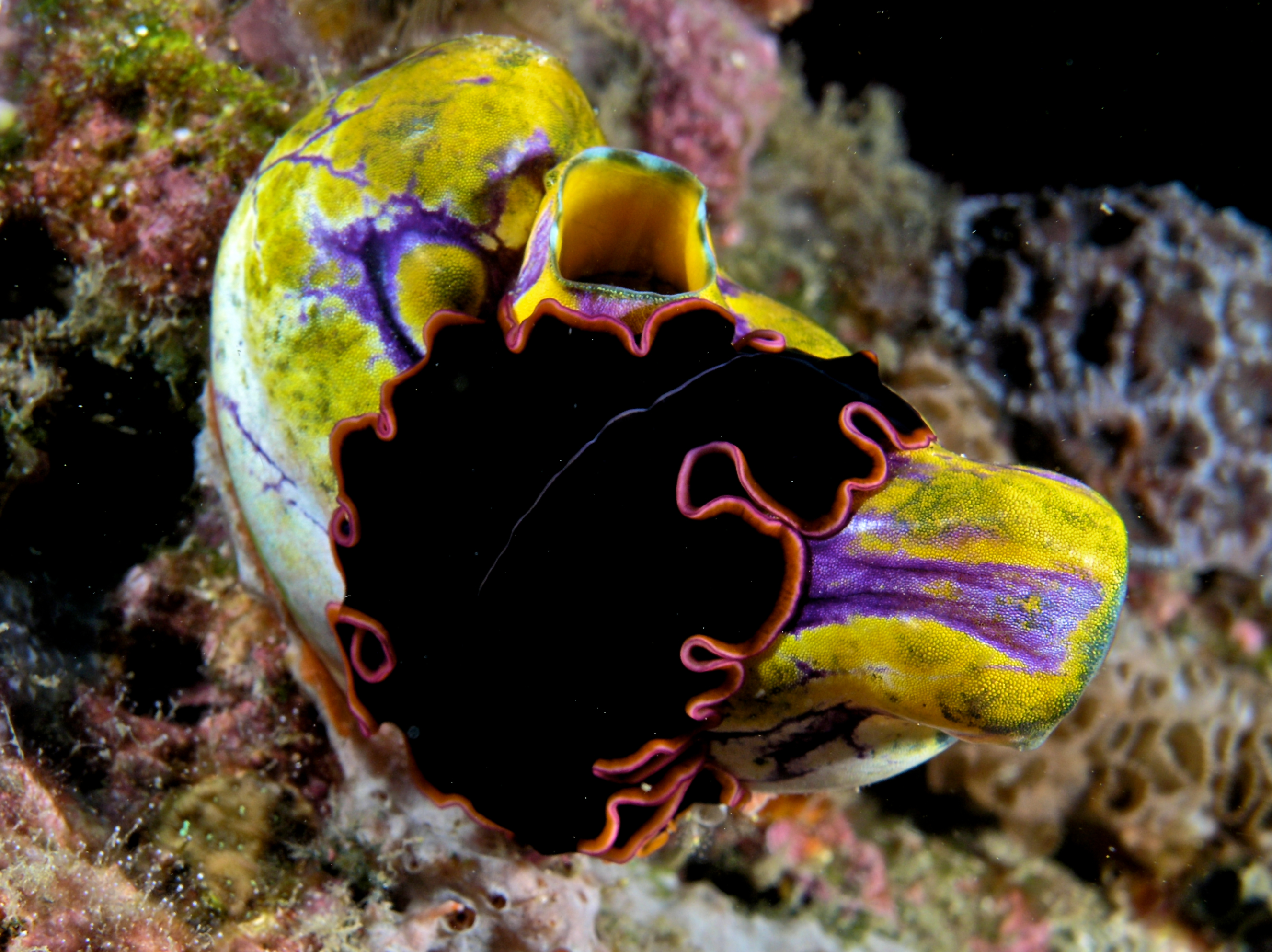
- Pseudobiceros gloriosus on Polycarpa aurata

Scientific classification
- Kingdom: Animalia
- Phylum: Platyhelminthes
- Order: Polycladida
- Suborder: Cotylea
- Family: Pseudocerotidae
- Genus: Pseudobiceros; Faubel, 1984

= Pseudobiceros =

Genus of flatworms

Pseudobiceros is a genus of flatworms. Like all flatworms, Pseudobiceros are hermaphrodites. This particular genus engages in penis fencing. When the "winner" touches its penis to the "skin" of the other, insemination occurs, and the "loser" has to bear the burden of motherhood.

== Species ==
The following species are recognised in the genus Pseudobiceros:

- Pseudobiceros apricus Newman & Cannon, 1994
- Pseudobiceros bajae (Hyman, 1953)
- Pseudobiceros bedfordi (Laidlaw, 1903)
- Pseudobiceros brogani Newman & Cannon, 1997
- Pseudobiceros caribbensis Bolanos, Quiroga & Litvaitis, 2007
- Pseudobiceros cinereus (Palombi, 1931)
- Pseudobiceros damawan Newman & Cannon, 1994
- Pseudobiceros deliae Coria, Bolaños & Quiroga, 2025
- Pseudobiceros dendriticus (Prudhoe, 1989)
- Pseudobiceros flavocanthus Newman & Cannon, 1994
- Pseudobiceros flavolineatus (Prudhoe, 1989)
- Pseudobiceros flowersi Newman & Cannon, 1997
- Pseudobiceros fulgor Newman & Cannon, 1994
- Pseudobiceros fulvogriseus (Hyman, 1959)
- Pseudobiceros gardinieri (Laidlaw, 1902)
- Pseudobiceros gloriosus (Newman & Cannon, 1994)
- Pseudobiceros gratus (Kato, 1937)
- Pseudobiceros hancockanus (Collingwood, 1876)
- Pseudobiceros hymanae (Newman & Cannon, 1997)
- Pseudobiceros izuensis (Kato, 1944)
- Pseudobiceros josei Newman & Cannon, 1998
- Pseudobiceros kryptos Newman & Cannon, 1997
- Pseudobiceros mikros Newman & Cannon, 1997
- Pseudobiceros miniatus (Schmarda, 1859)
- Pseudobiceros murinus Newman & Cannon, 1997
- Pseudobiceros nigromarginatus (Yeri & Kaburaki, 1918)
- Pseudobiceros pardalis (Verrill, 1900)
- Pseudobiceros philippinensis (Kaburaki, 1923)
- Pseudobiceros principensis Pérez-García, Herrero-Barrencua, Noreña & Cervera, 2020
- Pseudobiceros rubrocinctus (Schmarda, 1859)
- Pseudobiceros schmardae Faubel, 1984
- Pseudobiceros sharroni Newman & Cannon, 1997
- Pseudobiceros splendidus (Lang, 1884)
- Pseudobiceros stellae Newman & Cannon, 1994
- Pseudobiceros undulatus (Kelaart, 1858)
- Pseudobiceros uniarborensis Newman & Cannon, 1994
- Pseudobiceros viridis (Kelaart, 1858)
- Pseudobiceros wirtzi Bahia & Schroedl, 2016
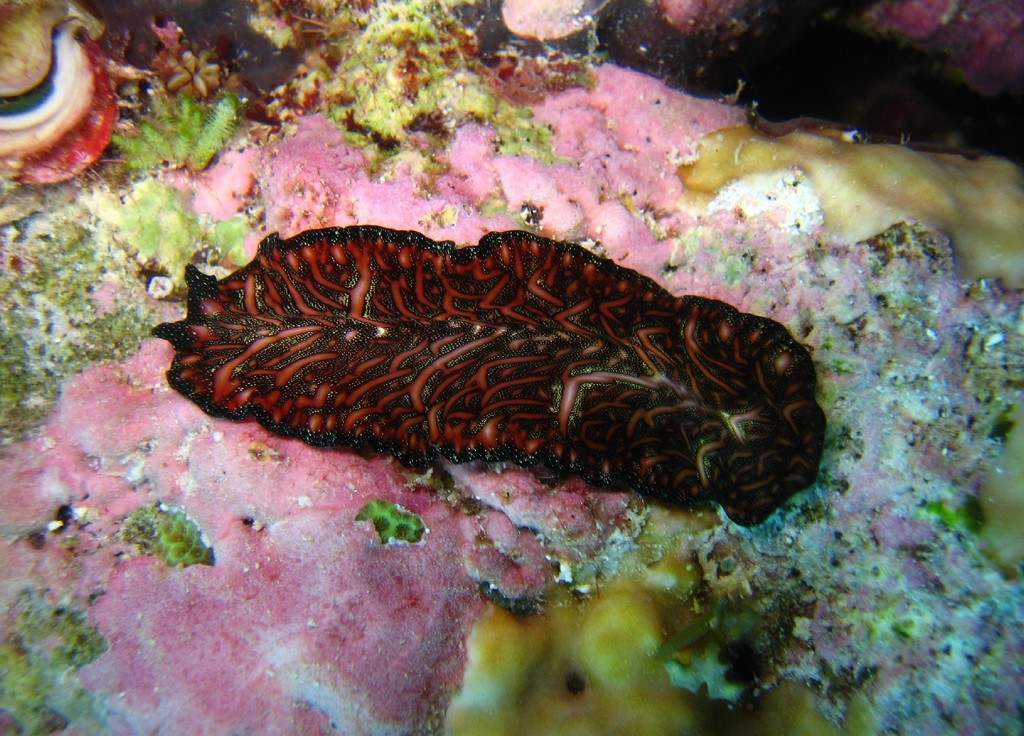
Pseudobiceros bedfordi

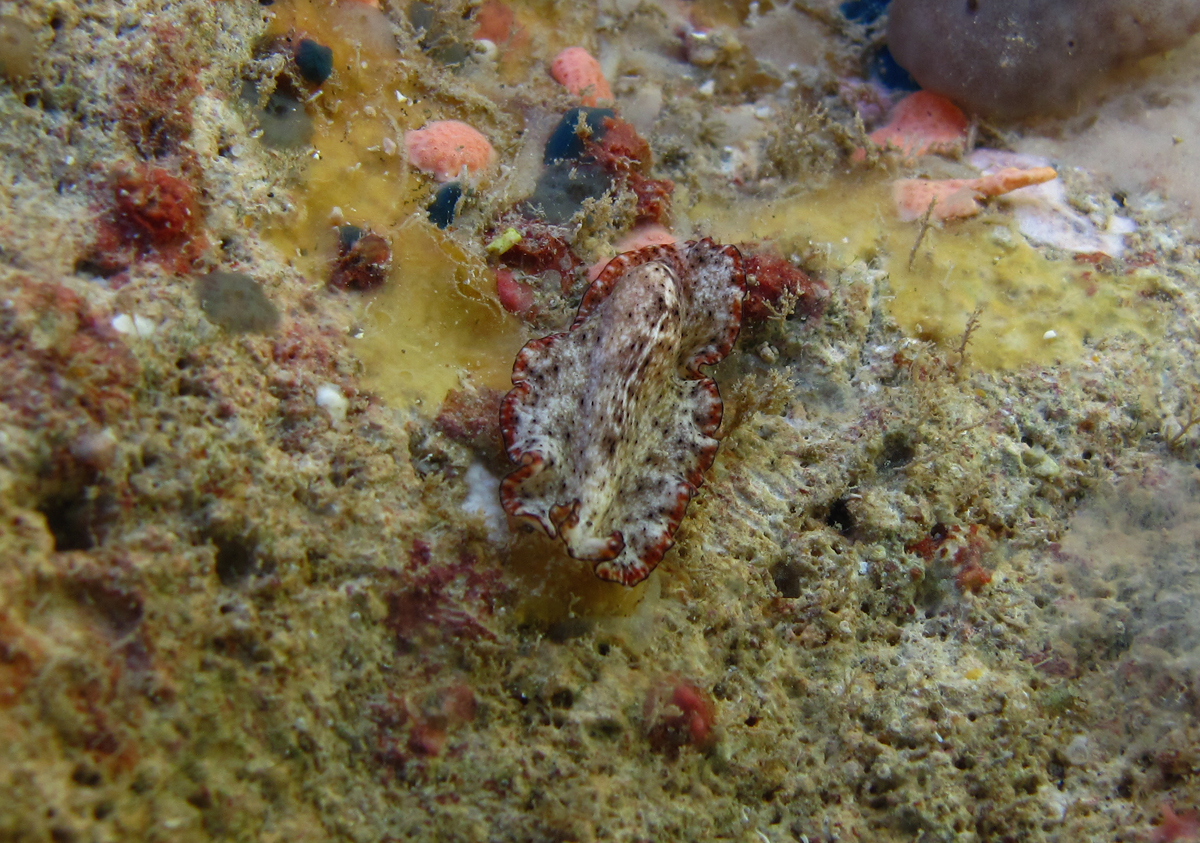
Pseudobiceros damawan

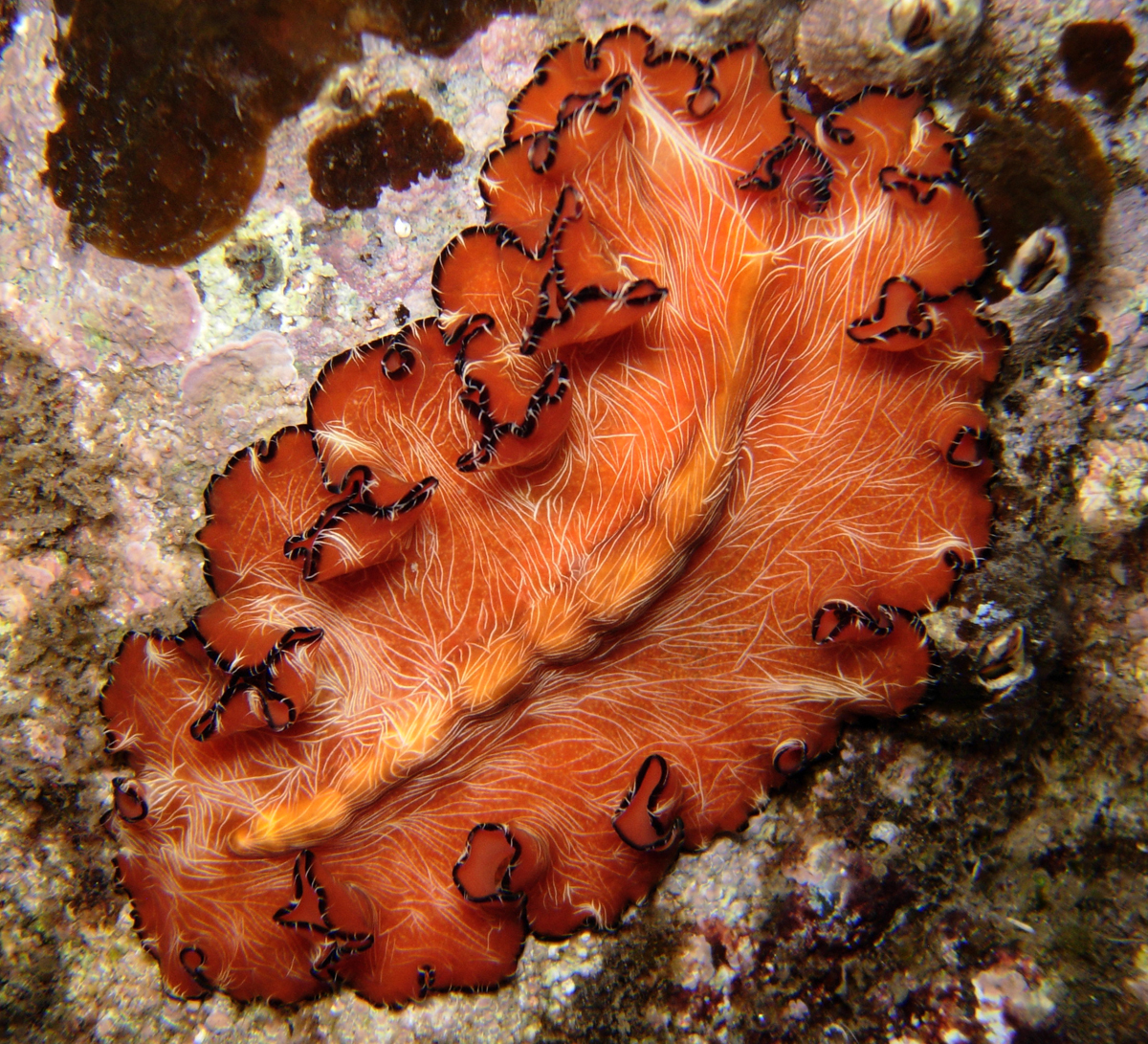
Pseudobiceros fulgor

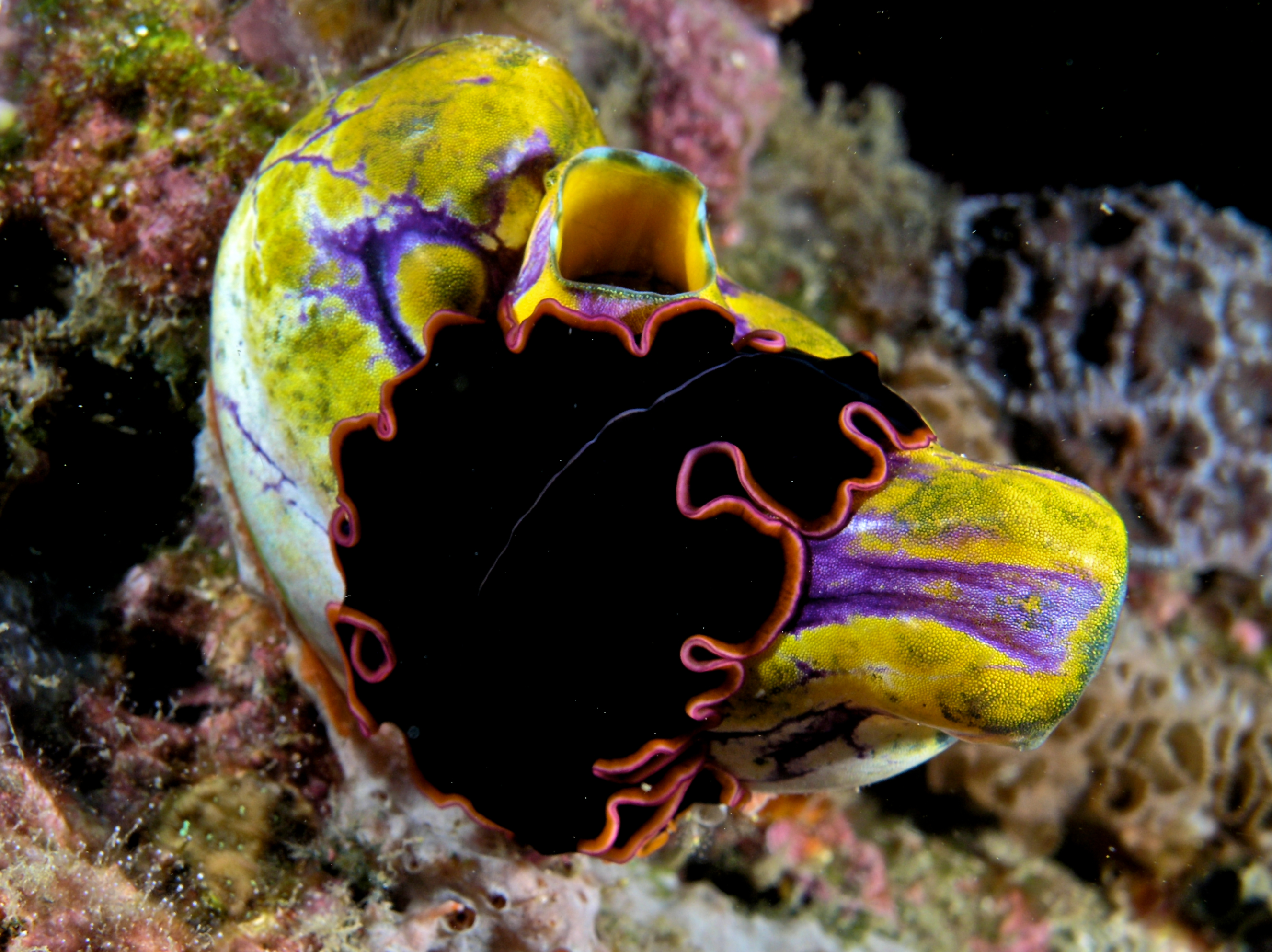
Pseudobiceros gloriosus

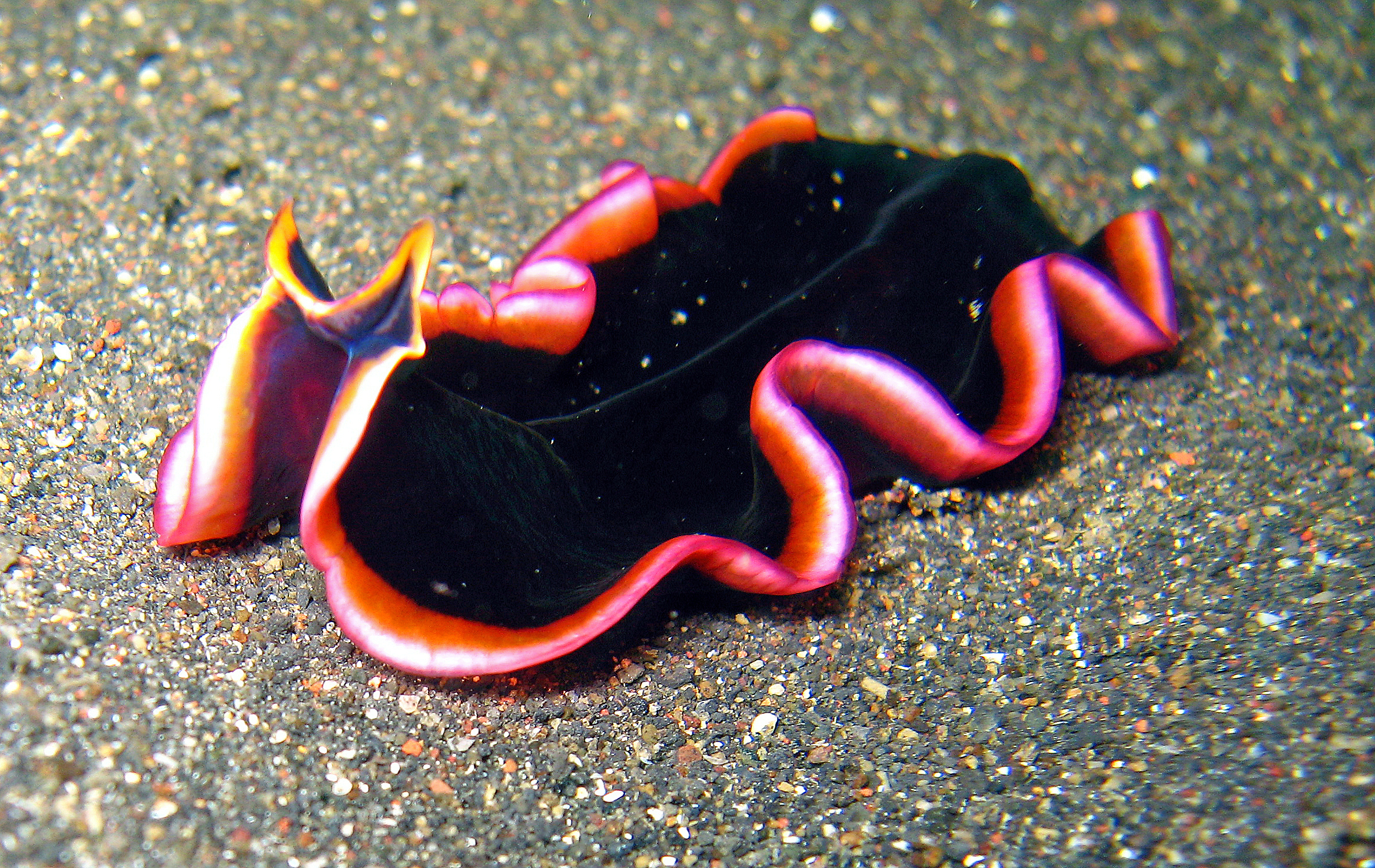
Pseudobiceros hancockanus

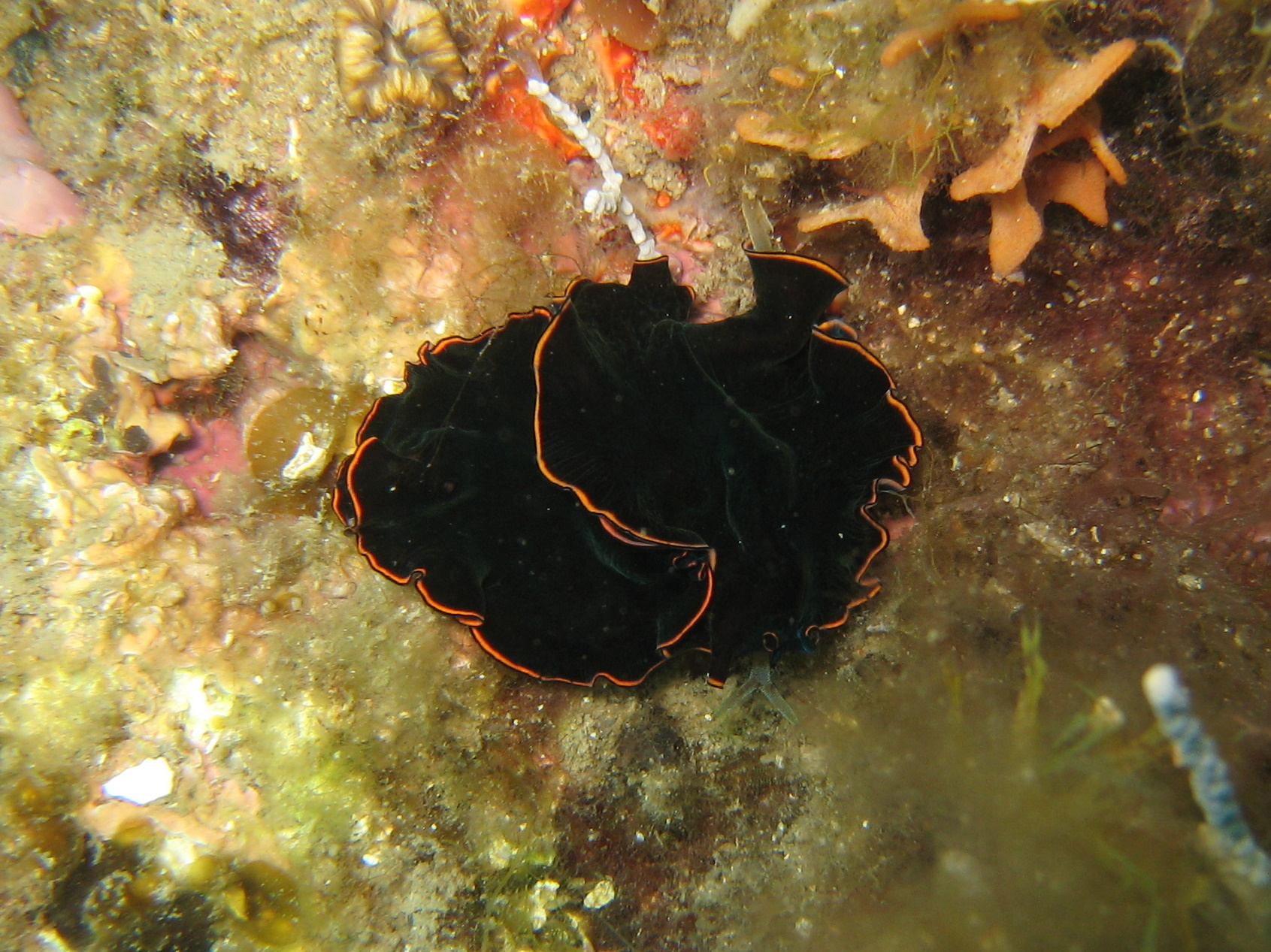
Pseudobiceros splendidus

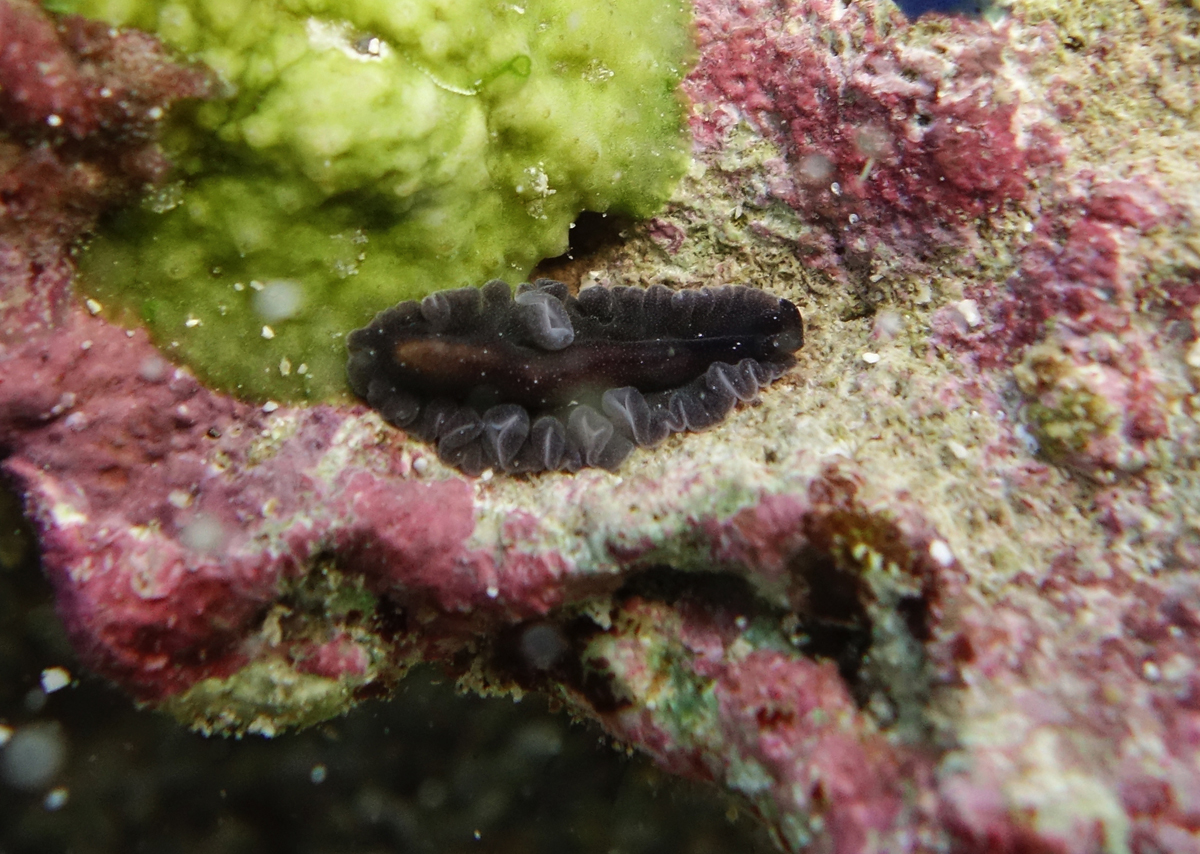
Pseudobiceros stellae

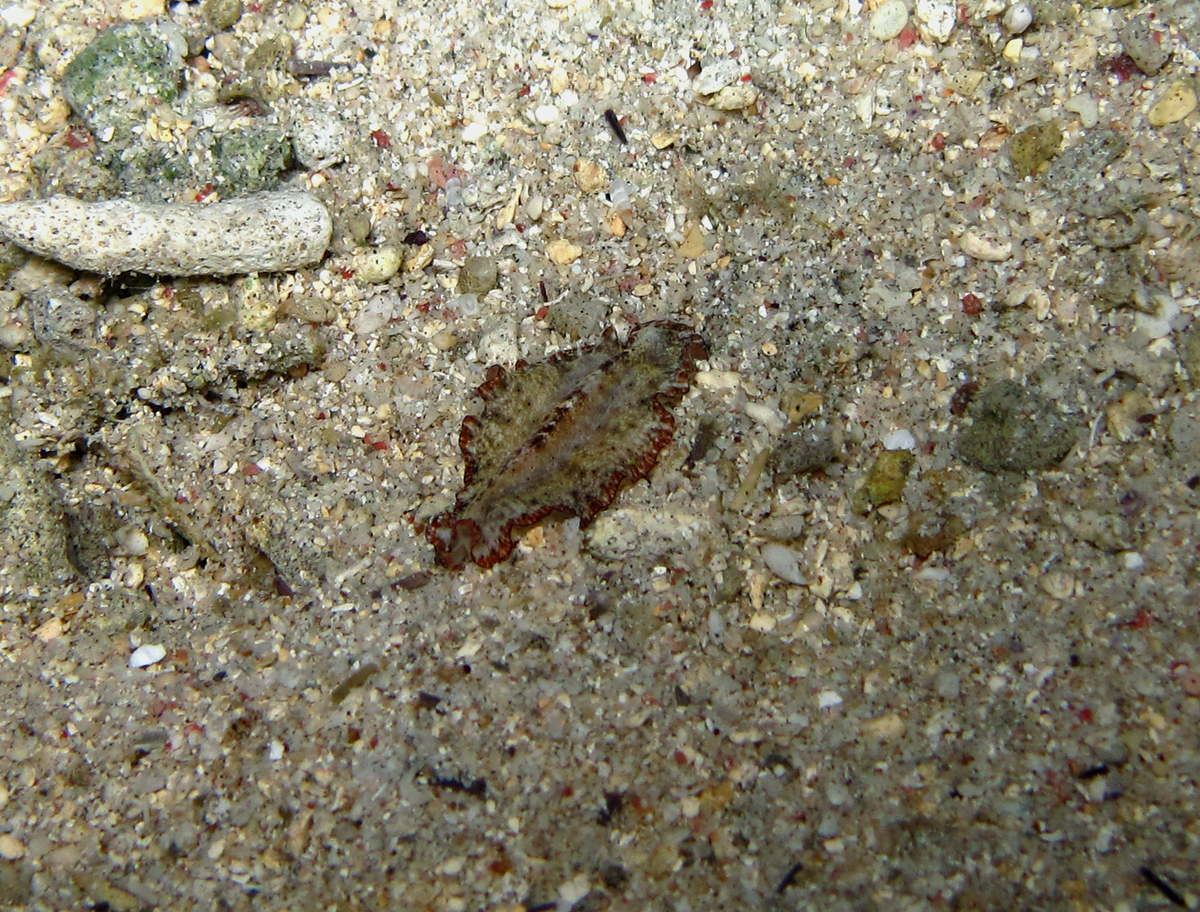
Pseudobiceros damawan

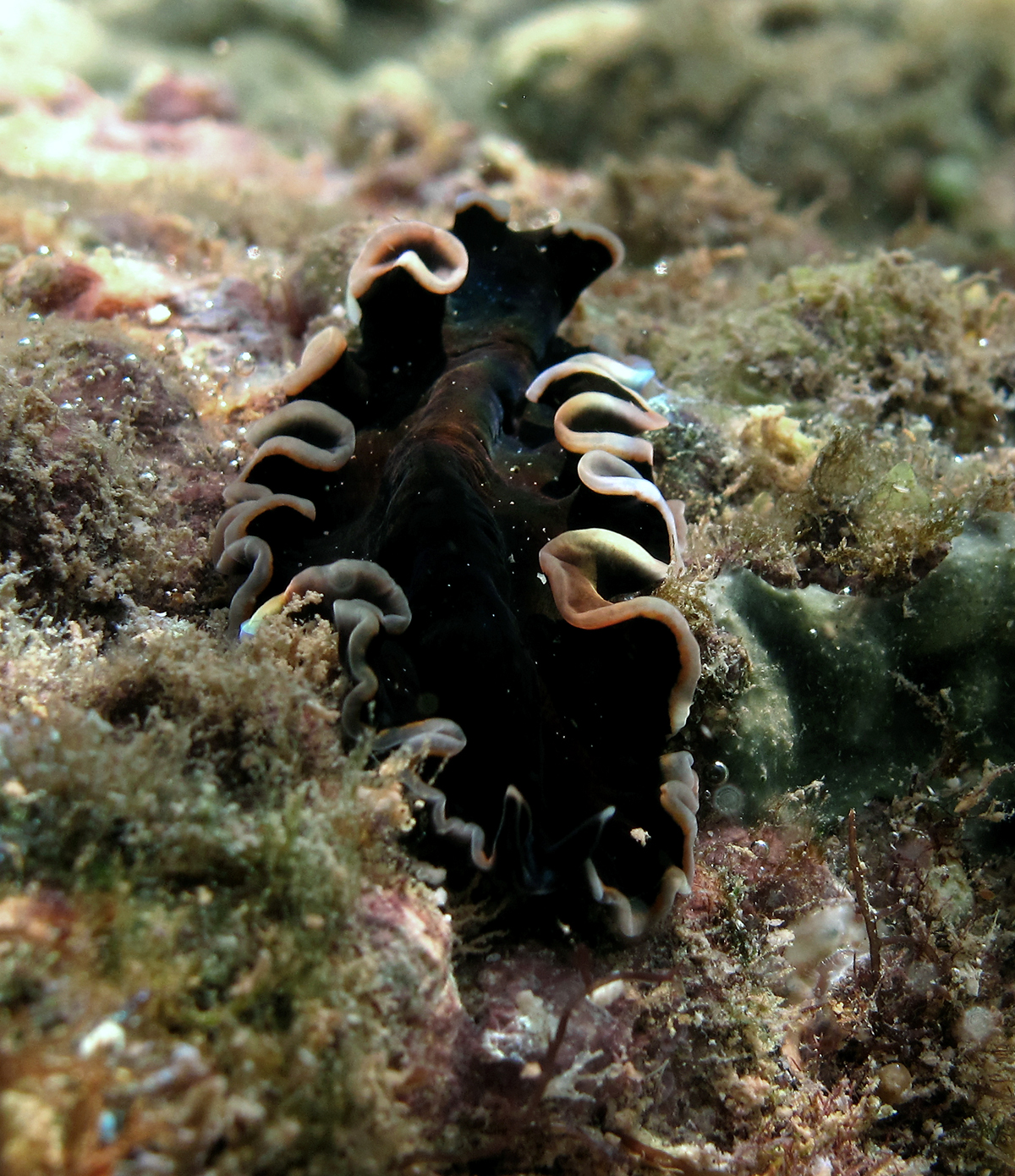
Pseudobiceros uniarborensis

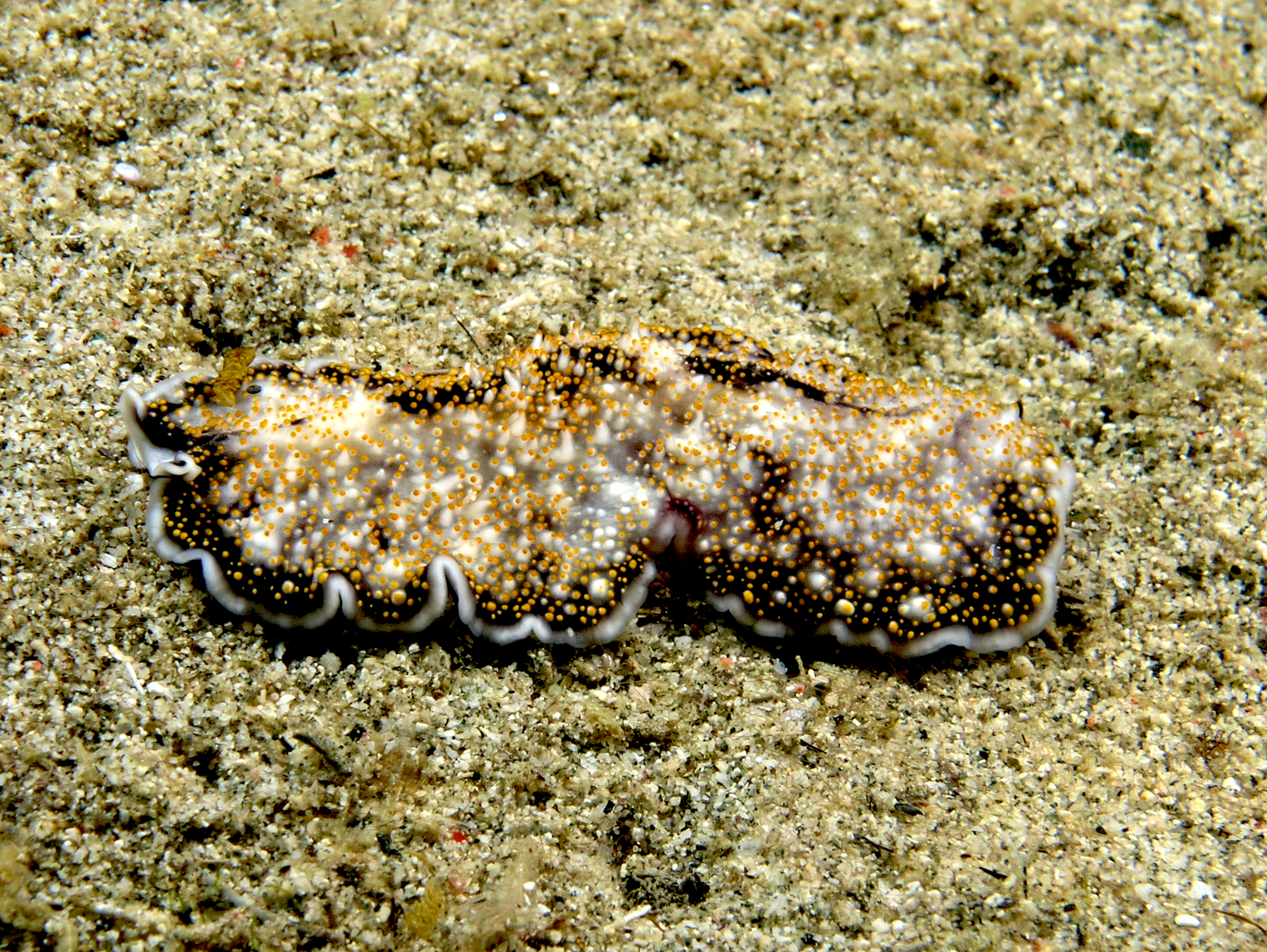
Unidentified Pseudobiceros

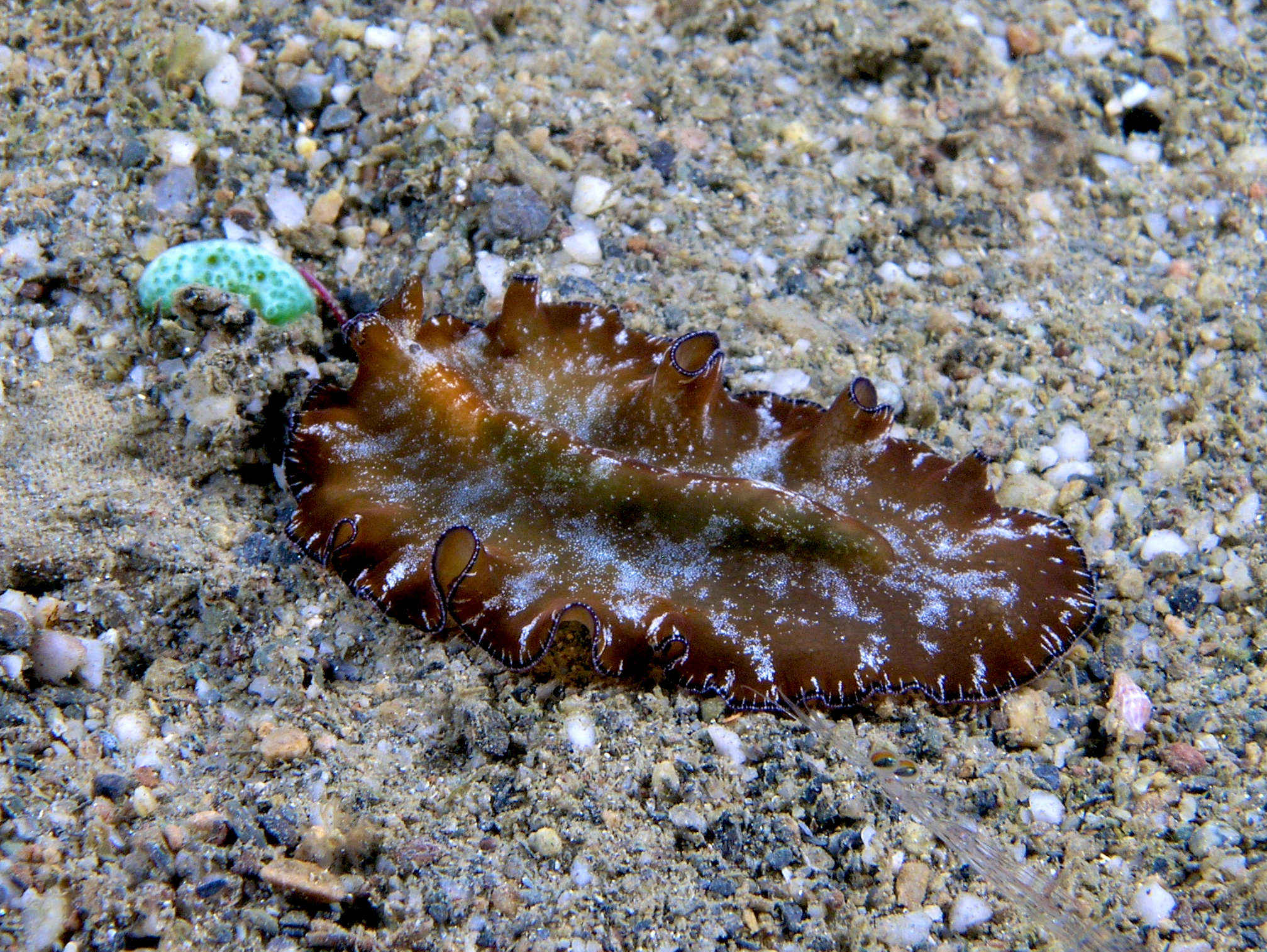
Unidentified Pseudobiceros

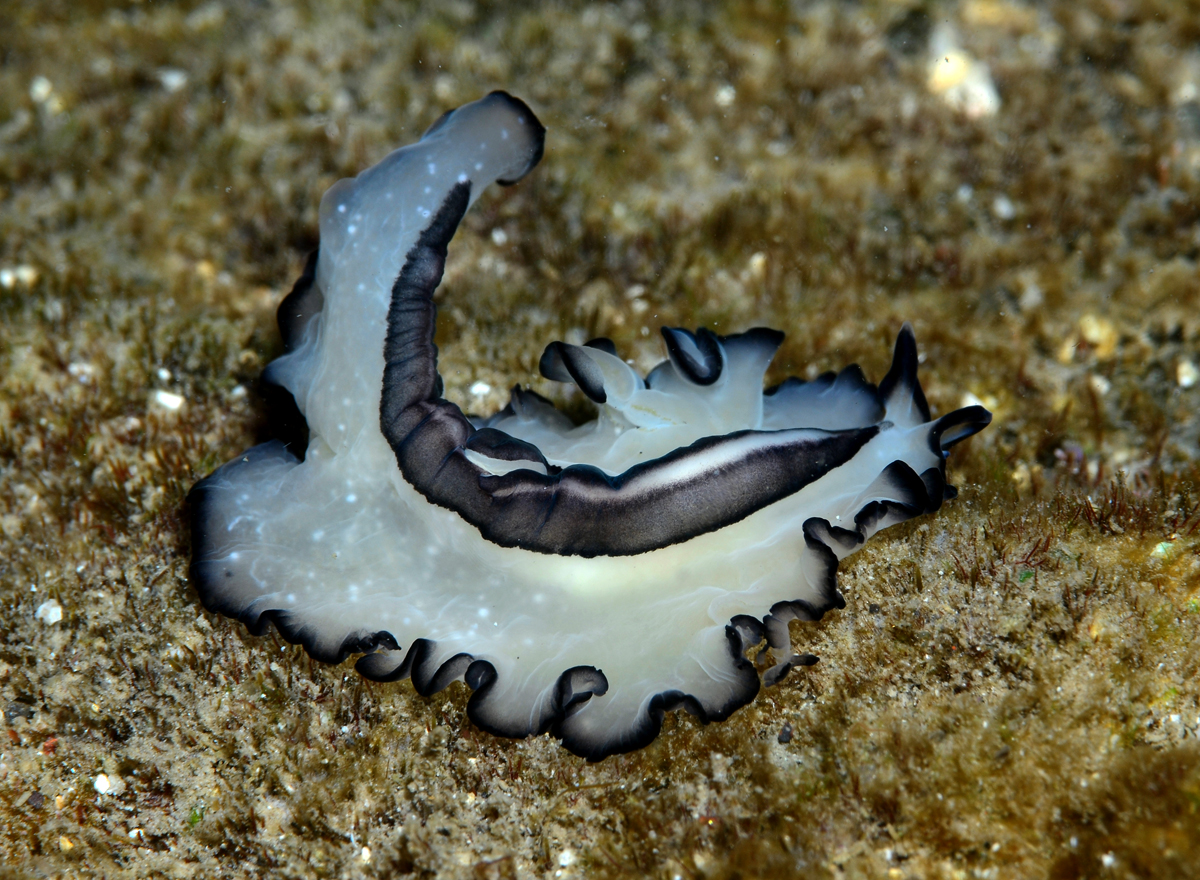
Unidentified Pseudobiceros
