= Colparion madgei =

Conservation status
- Extinct (IUCN 2.3)

Scientific classification
- Kingdom: Animalia
- Phylum: Mollusca
- Class: Gastropoda
- Order: Stylommatophora
- Family: Urocyclidae
- Genus: Colparion
- Species: †C. madgei

Binomial name
- †Colparion madgei Laidlaw, 1938

Extinct species of gastropod

Colparion madgei is an extinct species of hive snail endemic to Mauritius.
