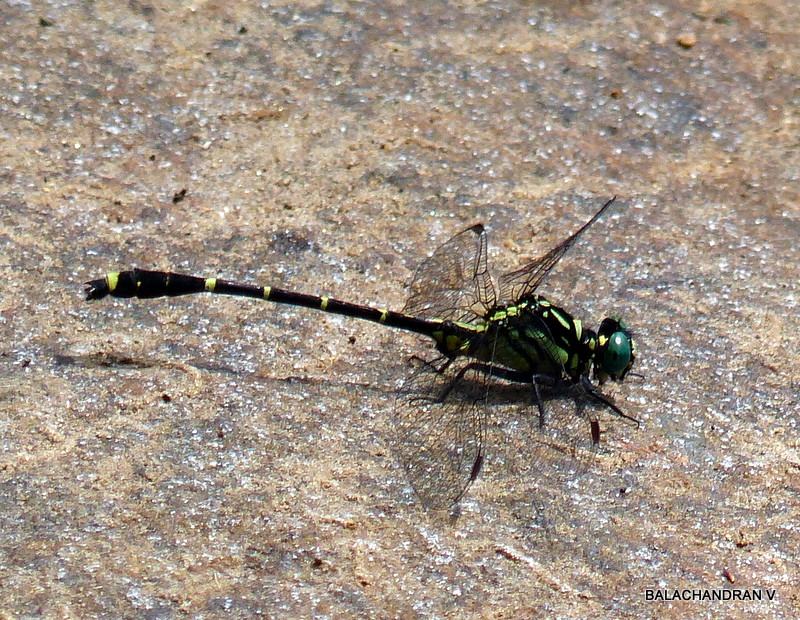
- Burmagomphus laidlawi

Scientific classification
- Kingdom: Animalia
- Phylum: Arthropoda
- Class: Insecta
- Order: Odonata
- Infraorder: Anisoptera
- Family: Gomphidae
- Genus: Burmagomphus; Williamson, 1907

= Burmagomphus =

Genus of dragonflies

Burmagomphus is a genus of dragonfly in the family Gomphidae. It contains the following species:

- Burmagomphus arboreus Lieftinck, 1940
- Burmagomphus arthuri Lieftinck, 1953
- Burmagomphus arvalis (Needham, 1930)
- Burmagomphus bashanensis Yang & Li, 1994
- Burmagomphus cauvericus Fraser, 1926
- Burmagomphus chaukulensis Joshi et al, 2022
- Burmagomphus collaris (Needham, 1930)
- Burmagomphus divaricatus Lieftinck, 1964
- Burmagomphus gratiosus Chao, 1954
- Burmagomphus hasimaricus Fraser, 1926
- Burmagomphus inscriptus (Hagen in Selys, 1878)
- Burmagomphus insolitus Asahina, 1986
- Burmagomphus insularis Laidlaw, 1914
- Burmagomphus intinctus (Needham, 1930)
- Burmagomphus johnseni Lieftinck, 1966
- Burmagomphus laidlawi Fraser, 1924
- Burmagomphus minusculus (Selys, 1878)
- Burmagomphus plagiatus Lieftinck, 1964
- Burmagomphus pyramidalis Laidlaw, 1922
- Burmagomphus sivalikensis Laidlaw, 1922
- Burmagomphus sowerbyi (Needham, 1930)
- Burmagomphus vermicularis (Martin, 1904)
- Burmagomphus v-flavum Fraser, 1926
- Burmagomphus williamsoni Förster, 1914
