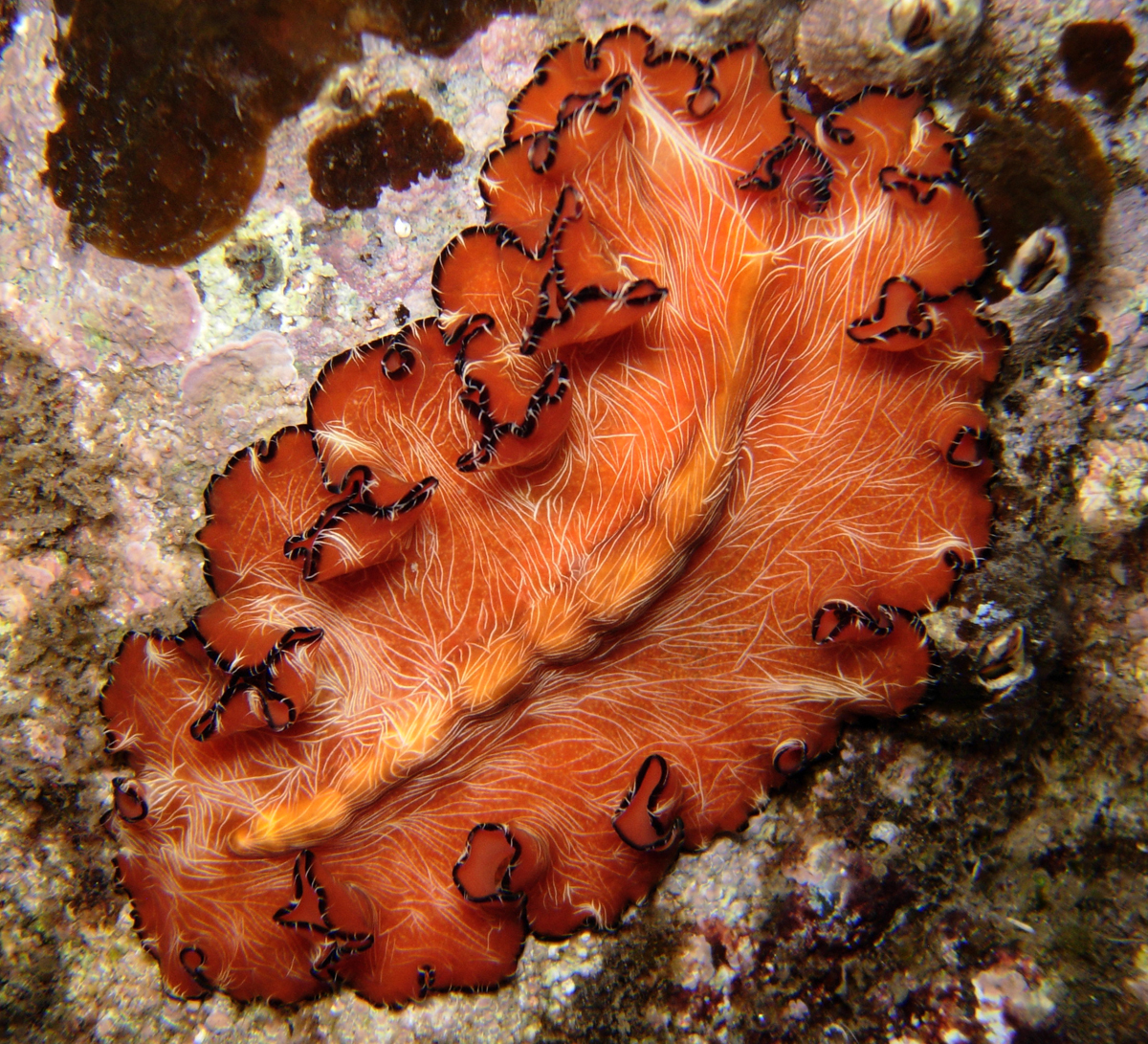

Scientific classification
- Kingdom: Animalia
- Phylum: Platyhelminthes
- Order: Polycladida
- Suborder: Cotylea
- Family: Pseudocerotidae
- Genus: Pseudobiceros
- Species: P. fulgor

Binomial name
- Pseudobiceros fulgor Newman & Cannon, 1994

= Pseudobiceros fulgor =

Species of flatworm

Pseudobiceros fulgor, also known the lightning worm, is a species of marine flatworm from the family Pseudocerotidae and belongs to the class Turbellaria. These flatworms are commonly found in the tropics of the Indo-Pacific region. They can be found in shallow coral reef environments.

Pseudobiceros fulgor like all flatworms, are triploblastic, meaning 3 germ layers present during development. These organisms are also acoelomate, lacking a body cavity between their gut and body wall. Pseudobiceros fulgor are bilaterally symmetrical, this helps to aid in their movement and navigation in their environment. During embryonic development stages they undergo mostly spiral cleavage. This influences the organization of their cells during development.

== Habitat ==
Pseudobiceros fulgor are commonly found in the tropic and subtropical oceans of the world. They inhabit shallow coral reefs, internal areas and seagrass beds that can be shared with crustaceans and mollusks. A key feature that helps Pseudobiceros fulgor with survivability in their environment is the ability to regenerate its body when injured. They are drawn towards areas with moderate water flow and high nutrient availability.

== Feeding ==
Pseudobiceros fulgor are carnivorous and feed on small invertebrates. To do this they use a specialized structure called a proboscis. They have a protrusible pharynx which is a tube like structure that extends out of the mouth. It is lined with tiny teeth that allows for them to grab and break down food. It is an important adaptation and helps to aid in their survivability.

== Reproduction ==
Pseudobiceros fulgor are hermaphroditic, which means that the male and female both have their respected reproductive organ. Internal fertilization takes place when sperm and egg come together. The fertilized eggs develop into juvenile flatworms and mature as smaller version of the adult due to no larval stage.

== Movement ==
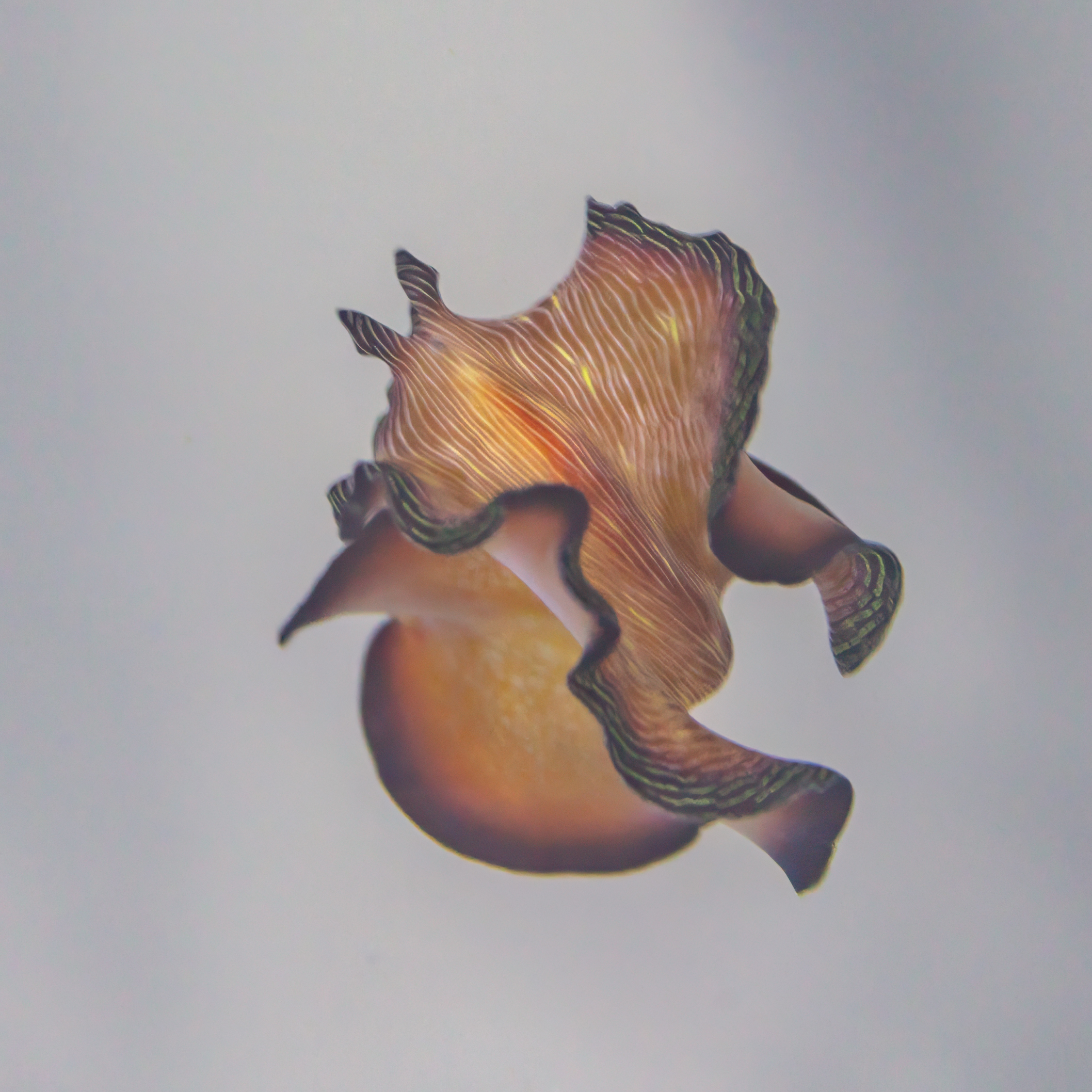
Pseudobiceros fulgor swimming

In order to move, Pseudobiceros fulgor use cilia which are hair like structures that cover the entirety of their body. The cilia which is a hair like structure beats back and forth in a wave like motion to propel the organisms forward. The flatworms can also use muscle contractions to traverse over the seafloor. The contractions are also useful in capturing prey and defending against predators.

== Sensory system ==
Pseudobiceros fulgor has a sensory system that helps it navigate and respond to stimuli. Sensory cells are scattered throughout its body that help to detect things such as light in the water. The sensory cells are connected to the ganglia, which acts as a rudimentary brain. Pseudobiceros fulgor have chemoreceptors which are specialized to detect chemical stimuli in the water. Additionally mechanoreceptors aid in detecting changes to pressure and touch.

== Features ==
Coloration is a defining feature for Pseudobiceros fulgor. It has orange-brown color and longitudinal broken streaks of white. It has pseudotentacles which appear as ear like structures. A short pharynx with 4 folds on each side differentiates P. fulgor from other Turbellaria.
