= Burmagomphus sivalikensis =

Conservation status
- Least Concern (IUCN 3.1)

Scientific classification
- Kingdom: Animalia
- Phylum: Arthropoda
- Class: Insecta
- Order: Odonata
- Infraorder: Anisoptera
- Family: Gomphidae
- Genus: Burmagomphus
- Species: B. sivalikensis

Binomial name
- Burmagomphus sivalikensis Laidlaw, 1922

Species of dragonfly

Burmagomphus sivalikensis is a species of dragonfly in the family Gomphidae. It is endemic to India. it is also found in Pakistan.
