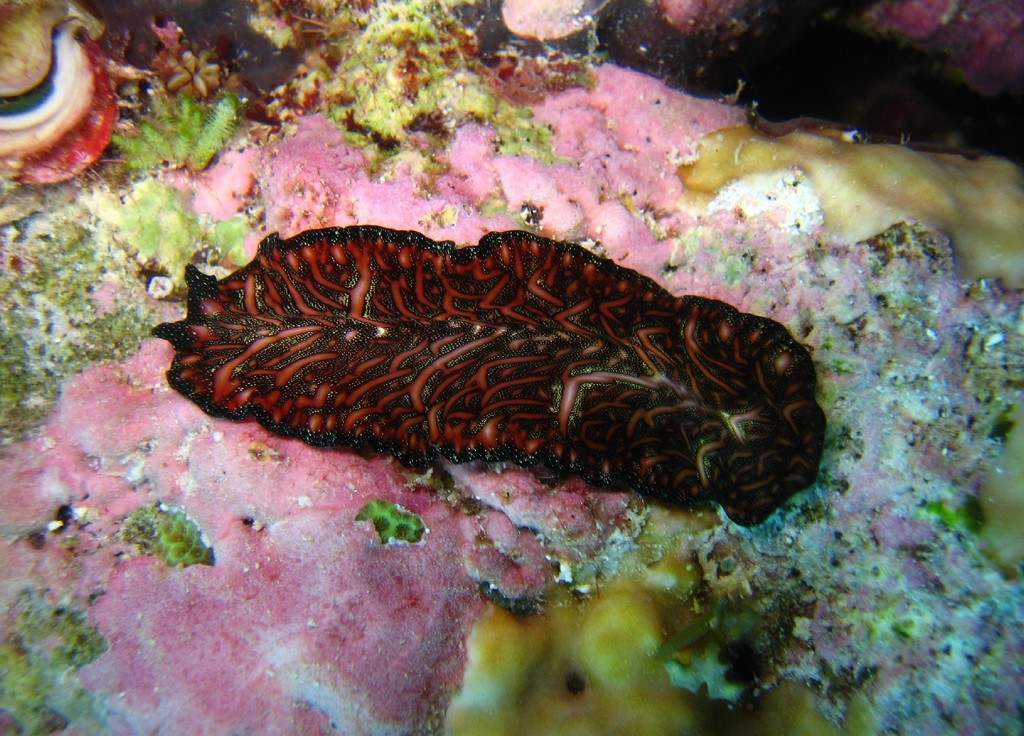

Scientific classification
- Kingdom: Animalia
- Phylum: Platyhelminthes
- Order: Polycladida
- Suborder: Cotylea
- Family: Pseudocerotidae
- Genus: Pseudobiceros
- Species: P. bedfordi

Binomial name
- Pseudobiceros bedfordi (Laidlaw, 1903)

Synonyms
- Pseudoceros bedfordi Laidlaw, 1903

= Pseudobiceros bedfordi =

Species of flatworm

Pseudobiceros bedfordi (common names Persian carpet flatworm and Bedford's flatworm) is a species of flatworm in the family Pseudocerotidae.

This species has two penises, which it uses to engage in penis fencing, attempting to inject sperm into its opponent to fertilize it, while simultaneously avoiding being fertilized by its opponent.

== Description ==
Pseudobiceros bedfordi is a large, polyclad flatworm about 8–10 cm in length. It has a distinctive pattern consisting of a brown to black background, with multiple transverse, bilateral pink lines around thousands of tightly spaced, bright-yellow spots, pink undulating spots with stripes on the sides of the body.

The edges of the body are usually ruffled. The underside of Pseudobiceros bedfordi is pale pink. The front of the body has a pair of erect pseudotentacles.

== Distribution ==
This species is found off Indonesia, Malaysia, Kenya, Micronesia, Northern Mariana Islands, Thailand, Australia, the Philippines, the Solomon Islands, Myanmar, and Palau.

== Habitat ==
P. bedfordi is found on coral rubble and ledges in back reefs, coastal bays, and in lagoons.

== Behaviour ==
This worm is fast-moving and able to swim by undulating its body. Individuals are also able to recognize members of their own species through their distinctive coloration patterns, which help prevent cross-species mating with similar flatworms that share the same coral-reef habitats.

== Diet ==
P. bedfordi feeds on ascidians and on crustaceans that are small enough to swallow.

== Reproduction ==
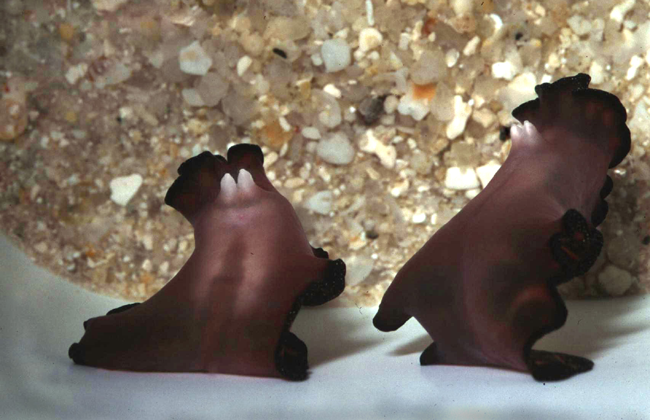
Two specimens of P. bedfordi about to engage in penis fencing

Like all flatworms in the genus Pseudobiceros, this species is hermaphroditic and has two penises. During mating, it fences with a conspecific using its penises, attempting to stab and inject sperm in its opponent, while avoiding being fertilized by the other. It is able to inseminate its opponent by injecting its sperm into any region of the other's body it is able to penetrate. After successfully injecting the other, the spermatozoa stream through the opponent's body on their way to ovaries, where they fertilize the eggs. The stream is visible through the body tissue of the worm, appearing as pale streaks, like lightning jags.
