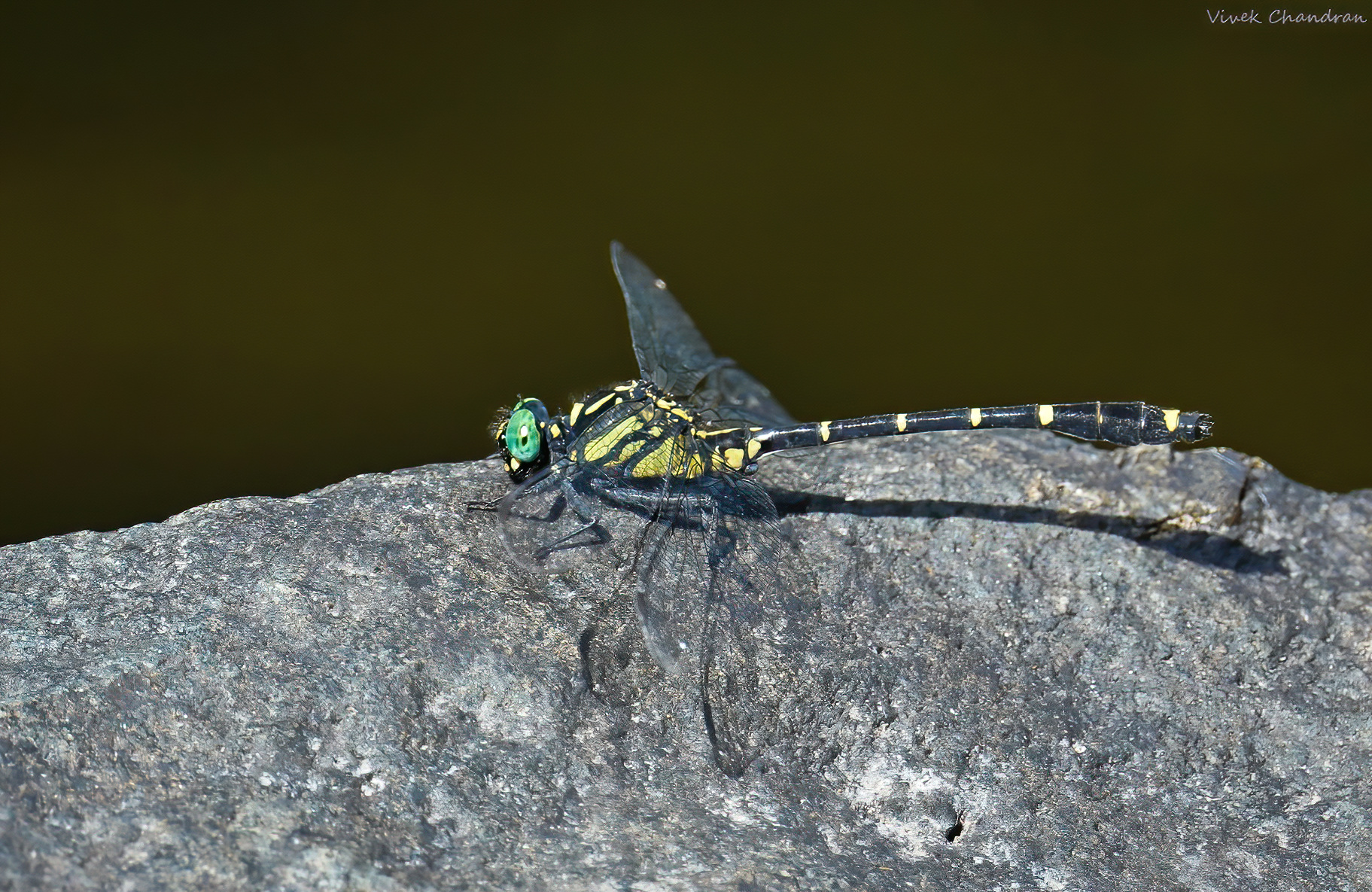
- Male

Scientific classification
- Domain: Eukaryota
- Kingdom: Animalia
- Phylum: Arthropoda
- Class: Insecta
- Order: Odonata
- Infraorder: Anisoptera
- Family: Gomphidae
- Genus: Burmagomphus
- Species: B. chaukulensis

Binomial name
- Burmagomphus chaukulensis Joshi, Ogale & Sawant, 2022

= Burmagomphus chaukulensis =

Species of dragonfly

Burmagomphus chaukulensis is a species of dragonfly in the family Gomphidae. The species name chaukulensis is coined from the type locality, Chaukul, Sindhudurg, Maharashtra.

== See also ==
- List of odonates of India
- List of odonata of Kerala
