= Colparion =

Scientific classification
- Domain: Eukaryota
- Kingdom: Animalia
- Phylum: Mollusca
- Class: Gastropoda
- Order: Stylommatophora
- Infraorder: Limacoidei
- Superfamily: Helicarionoidea
- Family: Urocyclidae
- Genus: Colparion; Laidlaw, 1938

Genus of gastropods

Colparion is a genus of minute, air-breathing land snails, terrestrial pulmonate gastropod mollusks or micromollusks in the family Urocyclidae.

== Species ==
Species within the genus Colparion include:

- Colparion madgei Laidlaw, 1938
