= Burmagomphus pyramidalis =

Conservation status
- Least Concern (IUCN 3.1)

- Least Concern (IUCN 3.1)

Scientific classification
- Kingdom: Animalia
- Phylum: Arthropoda
- Class: Insecta
- Order: Odonata
- Infraorder: Anisoptera
- Family: Gomphidae
- Genus: Burmagomphus
- Species: B. pyramidalis

Binomial name
- Burmagomphus pyramidalis Laidlaw, 1922

Species of dragonfly

Burmagomphus pyramidalis is a species of dragonfly in the family Gomphidae. There are two geographically separated subspecies, Burmagomphus pyramidalis pyramidalis in India and Burmagomphus pyramidalis sinuatus (sinuate clubtail) in Sri Lanka.

== Subspecies ==
- Burmagomphus pyramidalis pyramidalis – India
- Burmagomphus pyramidalis sinuatus – Sri Lanka

== Description and habitat ==
It is a medium sized dragonfly with black thorax, marked with greenish-yellow. There is a sinuous dorsal stripe which is formed by the union of an ante-humeral with a humeral stripe. Sides of the thorax are yellow, marked with a narrow, black stripe on the postero-lateral suture and on the lower half of the anterior suture. Wings are transparent, slightly tinted with saffron at bases. Abdomen is black, marked with yellow. Segment 1 has a triangular mark on dorsum at apex and a broad baso-lateral spot. Segment 2 has a dorsal stripe and a very broad spot on sides. Segment 3 to 8 have narrow basal rings. Segment 9 has its apical half yellow. Segment 10 is entirely black. Anal appendages are black. Female is similar to the male.

It is found on the river sides and on the rocks in the streams.

== See also ==
- List of odonates of India
  - List of odonata of Kerala
- List of odonates of Sri Lanka
