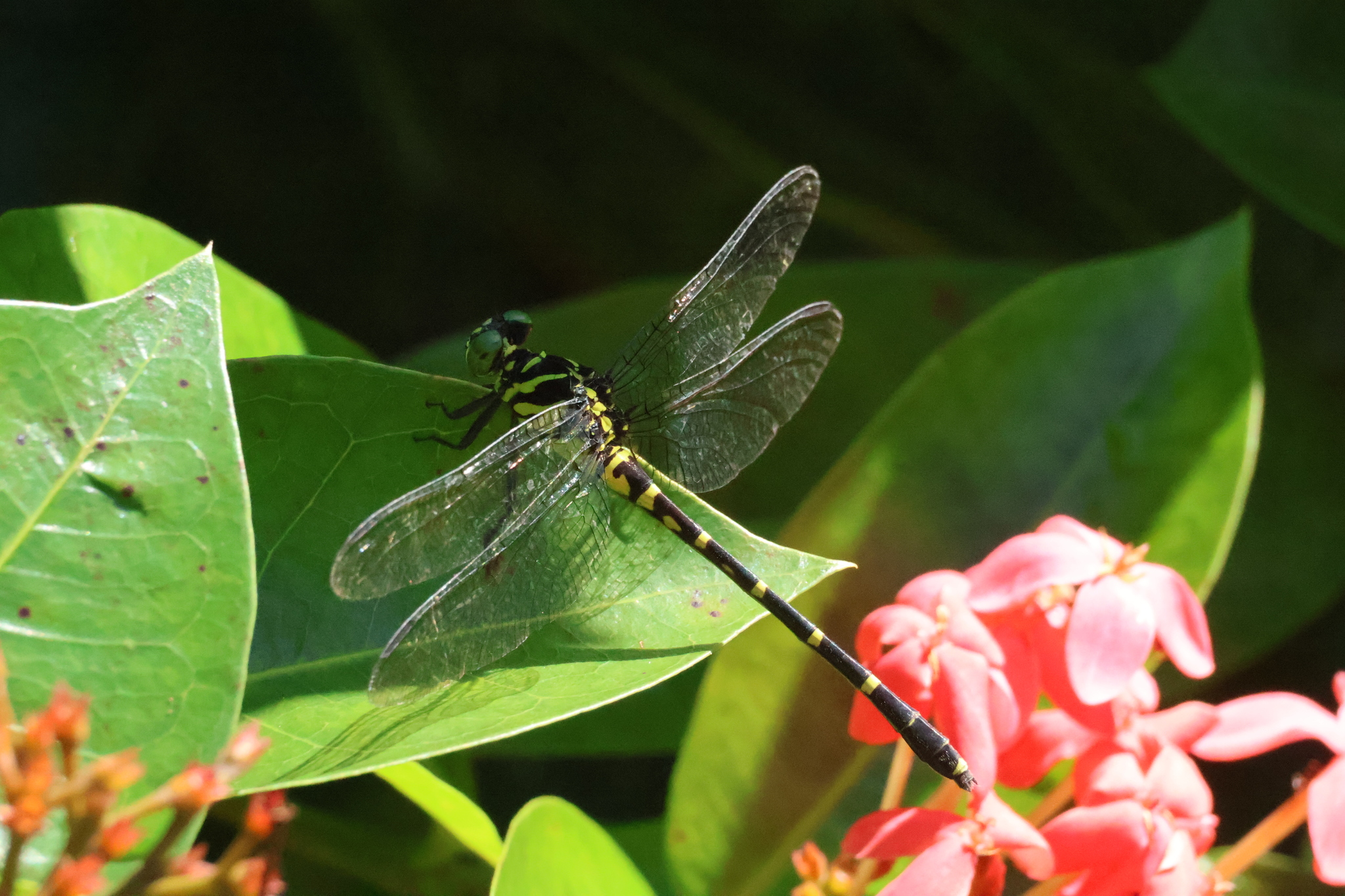

Scientific classification
- Kingdom: Animalia
- Phylum: Arthropoda
- Class: Insecta
- Order: Odonata
- Infraorder: Anisoptera
- Family: Gomphidae
- Genus: Burmagomphus
- Species: B. vermicularis

Binomial name
- Burmagomphus vermicularis (Martin, 1904)

Synonyms
- Gomphus vermicularis Martin, 1904

= Burmagomphus vermicularis =

Species of dragonfly

Burmagomphus vermicularis, the dog-legged clubtail, is a species of clubtail dragonfly found in East Asia.

== Taxonomy ==
Burmagomphus vermicularis was first scientifically described in 1904 in the genus Gomphus by Martin, from a specimen found in Tonkin (Vietnam). In 1907, the species was redescribed and transferred to the new genus Burmagomphus by Williamson. Martin's original description was "very poor and without illustrations".

== Distribution ==
In China, it is known from the southern provinces of Fujian, Guangdong, and Hainan. It is also known from Hong Kong and the neighbouring countries of Taiwan and Vietnam, as well as Thailand and mainland Malaysia.

== Ecology ==
They have been observed being hunted by a larger species of dragonfly, Labrogomphus torvus.
