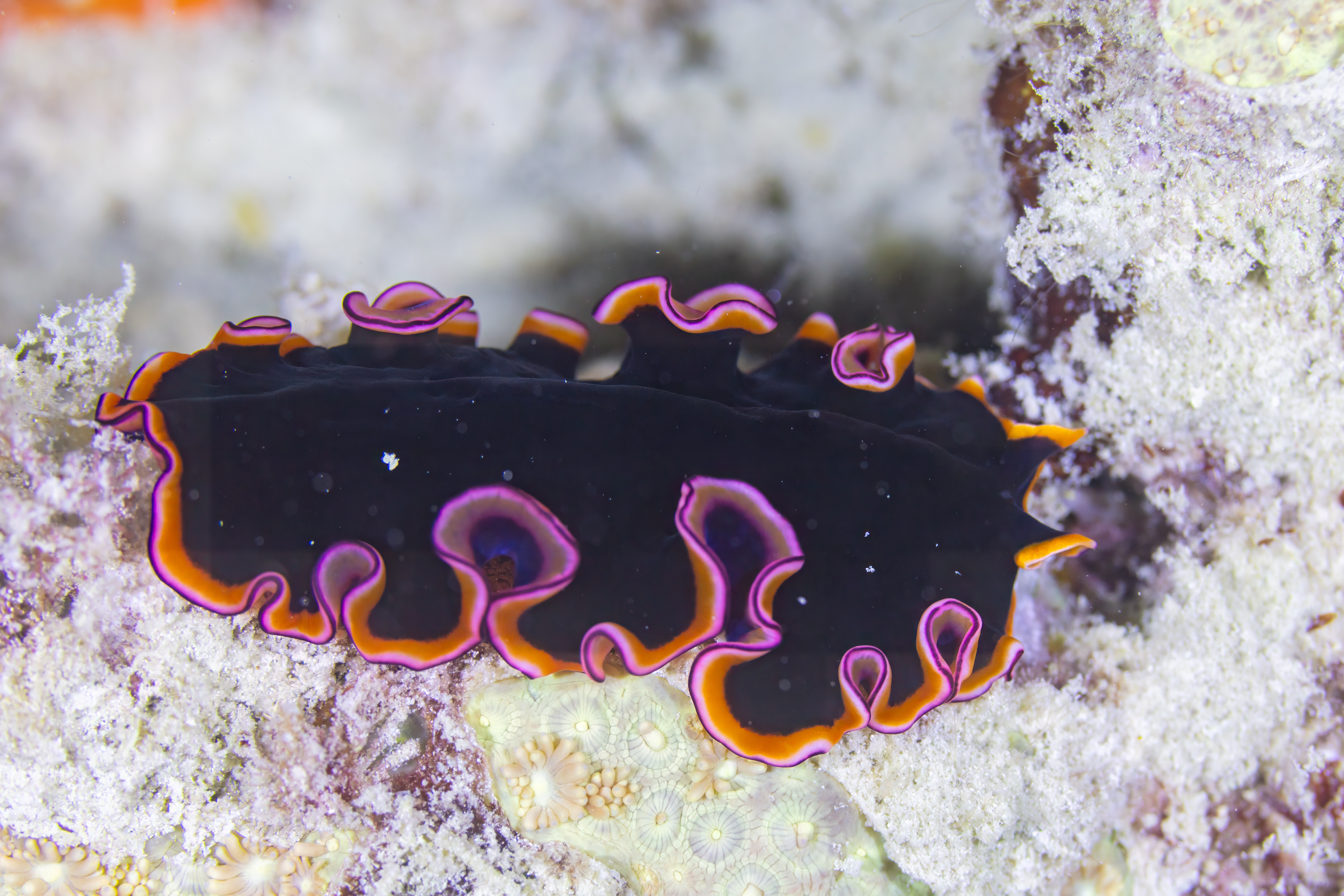
- Pseudobiceros gloriosus off the coast of Zanzibar, Tanzania.

Scientific classification
- Kingdom: Animalia
- Phylum: Platyhelminthes
- Order: Polycladida
- Suborder: Cotylea
- Family: Pseudocerotidae
- Genus: Pseudobiceros
- Species: P. gloriosus

Binomial name
- Pseudobiceros gloriosus (Newman & Cannon, 1994)

= Pseudobiceros gloriosus =

Species of flatworm

Pseudobiceros gloriosus (common name: the Glorious flatworm) is a benthic marine flatworm species that belongs to the Pseudocerotidae family. It is typically found in the tropical Indo-Pacific, from Eastern Africa to Micronesia, in the top or slope of reefs. It can be up to 3 in. (7.6 cm.) in length, and feeds on a multitude of invertebrates as gastropods and small crustaceans by engulfing their prey whole.

== Physical characteristics ==
The body is flat, long and quite large. The background color is black with a velvety appearance. The body's margin is ornated with bands: the inner is wide and orange, the middle is narrow and pink and outer is a dark burgundy rim. The pseudotentacles have only the orange line. Some of the larger specimens can have a narrow pink median line, starting close to the cerebral eyespots and ending before the posterior margin. The body is slightly raised on the longitudinal median line and there are two square pseudotentacles with few eyes. The cerebral cluster consists of about 200 eyespots, presence of a long pharynx with simple folds.

== Bibliography and references ==
- Leslie Newman & Lester Cannon, "Marine Flatworms", CSIRO publishing, 2003, ISBN 0-643-06829-5
- Neville Coleman, "Marine life of Maldives", Atoll editions, 2004, ISBN 187-6410-361
- Andrea & Antonnella Ferrrari, "Macrolife", Nautilus publishing, 2003, ISBN 983-2731-00-3
