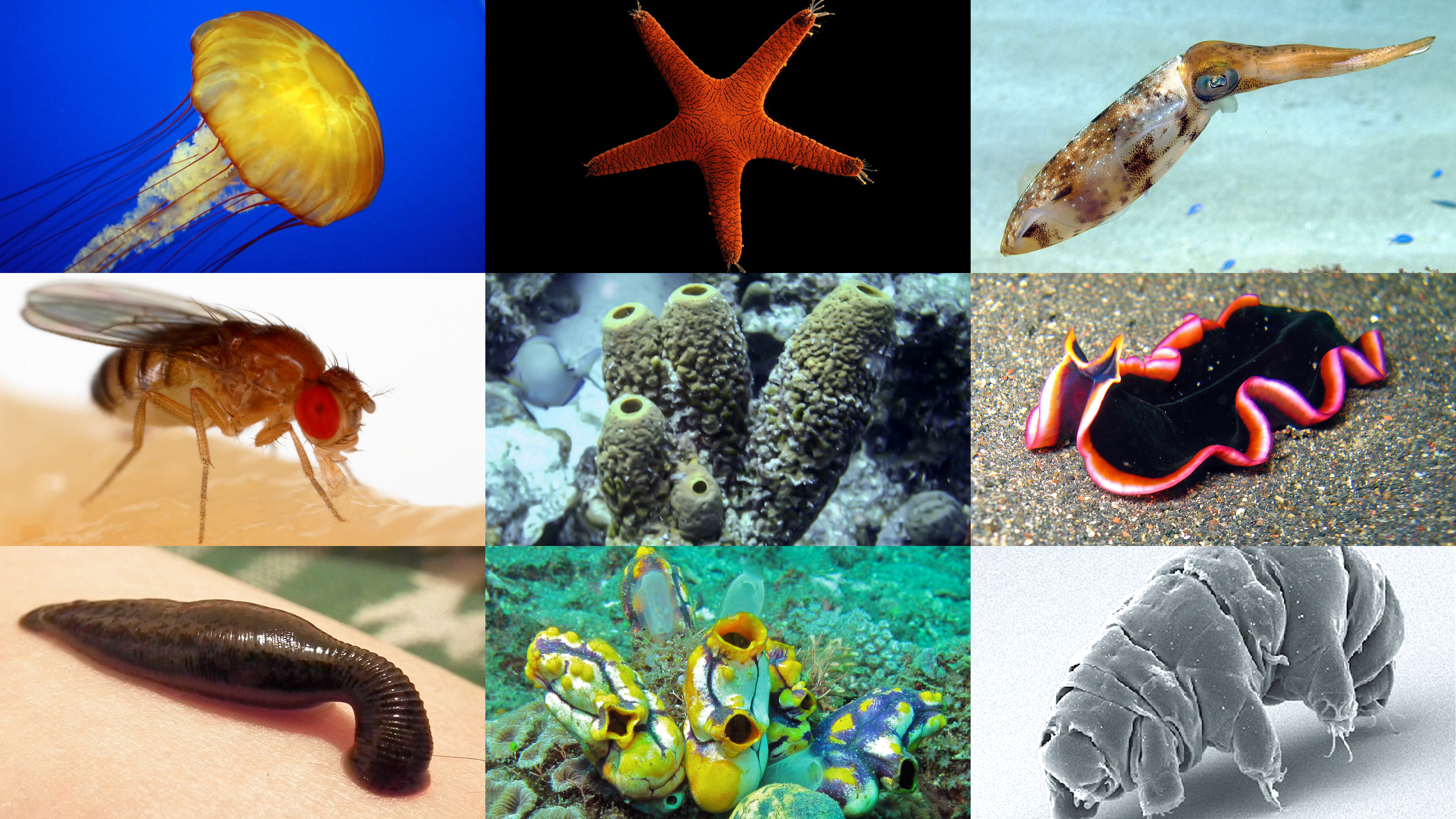
- Left to right: Chrysaora fuscescens (Cnidaria), Fromia indica (Echinodermata), Caribbean reef squid (Mollusca), Drosophila melanogaster (Arthropoda), Aplysina lacunosa (Porifera), Pseudobiceros hancockanus (Platyhelminthes), Hirudo medicinalis (Annelida), Polycarpa aurata (Tunicata), Milnesium tardigradum (Tardigrada).

Scientific classification
- Clade: Choanozoa
- Kingdom: Animalia

Groups included
- All animal groups not in the subphylum Vertebrata

Animals that are not considered invertebrates
- Vertebrata

= Invertebrate =

Invertebrates

Animals without a vertebral column

Invertebrates are animals that neither develop nor retain a vertebral column (commonly known as a spine or backbone), which evolved from the notochord. It is a paraphyletic grouping including all animals excluding the chordate subphylum Vertebrata, i.e. vertebrates. Nonetheless, almost all invertebrates belong to the monophyletic clade Protostomia, including arthropods, molluscs, annelids, and flatworms. Some of the well-known remaining invertebrates are deuterostomes such as echinoderms and tunicates, or animals outside the protostome/deuterostome split, including cnidarians and sponges.

The majority of animal species are invertebrates; one estimate puts the figure at 97%. Many invertebrate taxa have a greater number and diversity of species than the entire subphylum of Vertebrata. Invertebrates vary widely in size, from 10 μm (0.0004 in) myxozoans to the 9–10 m (30–33 ft) colossal squid.

Some so-called invertebrates, such as the Tunicata and Cephalochordata, are actually sister chordate subphyla to Vertebrata, being more closely related to vertebrates than to other invertebrates. This makes the "invertebrates" paraphyletic, so the term has no significance in taxonomy.

== Etymology ==
The word "invertebrate" comes from the Latin word vertebra, which means a joint in general, and sometimes specifically a joint from the spinal column of a vertebrate. The jointed aspect of vertebra is derived from the concept of turning, expressed in the root verto or vorto, to turn. The prefix in- means "not" or "without".

== Taxonomic significance ==
The term invertebrates does not describe a taxon in the same way that Arthropoda, Vertebrata or Manidae do. Each of those terms describes a valid taxon, phylum, subphylum or family. "Invertebrata" is a term of convenience, not a taxon; it has very little circumscriptional significance except within the Chordata. The Vertebrata as a subphylum comprises such a small proportion of the Metazoa that to speak of the kingdom Animalia in terms of "Vertebrata" and "Invertebrata" has limited practicality. In the more formal taxonomy of Animalia other attributes logically should precede the presence or absence of the vertebral column in constructing a cladogram, for example, the presence of a notochord. That would at least circumscribe the Chordata. However, even the notochord would be a less fundamental criterion than aspects of embryological development and symmetry or perhaps Bauplan.

Despite this, the concept of invertebrates as a taxon of animals has persisted for over a century among the laity, and within the zoological community and in its literature it remains in use as a term of convenience for animals that are not members of the Vertebrata. The following text reflects earlier scientific understanding of the term and of those animals which have constituted it. According to this understanding, invertebrates do not possess a skeleton of bone, either internal or external. They include hugely varied body plans. Many have fluid-filled, hydrostatic skeletons, like jellyfish or worms. Others have hard exoskeletons, outer shells like those of insects and crustaceans. The most familiar invertebrates include the Protozoa, Porifera, Coelenterata, Platyhelminthes, Nematoda, Annelida, Echinodermata, Mollusca and Arthropoda. Arthropoda include insects, crustaceans and arachnids.

== Number of extant species ==
By far the largest number of described invertebrate species are insects. The following table lists the number of described extant species for major invertebrate groups as estimated in the IUCN Red List of Threatened Species, 2014.3.

Invertebrate group	Phylum	Image	Estimated number of described species
Insects	Arthropoda		1,000,000
Arachnids	Arthropoda		102,248
Gastropods	Mollusca		85,000
Crustaceans	Arthropoda		47,000
Bivalves	Mollusca		20,000
Sea anemones, corals, sea pens	Cnidaria		2,175
Cephalopods	Mollusca		900
Velvet worms	Onychophora		165
Horseshoe crabs	Arthropoda		4
Others jellyfish, echinoderms, sponges, etc.	—	—	68,658
		Total:	~1,300,000

The IUCN estimates that 66,178 extant vertebrate species have been described, which means that over 95% of the described animal species in the world are invertebrates.

== Characteristics ==
The trait that is common to all invertebrates is the absence of a vertebral column (backbone): this creates a distinction between invertebrates and vertebrates. The distinction is one of convenience only; it is not based on any clear biologically homologous trait, any more than the common trait of having wings functionally unites insects, bats, and birds, or than not having wings unites tortoises, snails and sponges. Being animals, invertebrates are heterotrophs, and require sustenance in the form of the consumption of other organisms. With a few exceptions, such as the Porifera, invertebrates generally have bodies composed of differentiated tissues. There is also typically a digestive chamber with one or two openings to the exterior.

=== Morphology and symmetry ===
The body plans of most multicellular organisms exhibit some form of symmetry, whether radial, bilateral, or spherical. A minority, however, exhibit no symmetry. One example of asymmetric invertebrates includes all gastropod species. This is easily seen in snails and sea snails, which have helical shells. Slugs appear externally symmetrical, but their pneumostome (breathing hole) is located on the right side. Other gastropods develop external asymmetry, such as Glaucus atlanticus that develops asymmetrical cerata as they mature. The origin of gastropod asymmetry is a subject of scientific debate.

Other examples of asymmetry are found in fiddler crabs and hermit crabs. They often have one claw much larger than the other. If a male fiddler loses its large claw, it will grow another on the opposite side after moulting. Sessile animals such as sponges are asymmetrical alongside coral colonies (with the exception of the individual polyps that exhibit radial symmetry); Alpheidae claws that lack pincers; and some copepods, polyopisthocotyleans, and monogeneans which parasitize by attachment or residency within the gill chamber of their fish hosts).

==== Nervous system ====
Neurons differ in invertebrates from mammalian cells. Invertebrates cells fire in response to similar stimuli as mammals, such as tissue trauma, high temperature, or changes in pH. The first invertebrate in which a neuron cell was identified was the medicinal leech, Hirudo medicinalis. Learning and memory using nociceptors have been described in the sea hare, Aplysia. Mollusk neurons are able to detect increasing pressures and tissue trauma.

Neurons have been identified in a wide range of invertebrate species, including annelids, molluscs, nematodes and arthropods.

==== Respiratory system ====
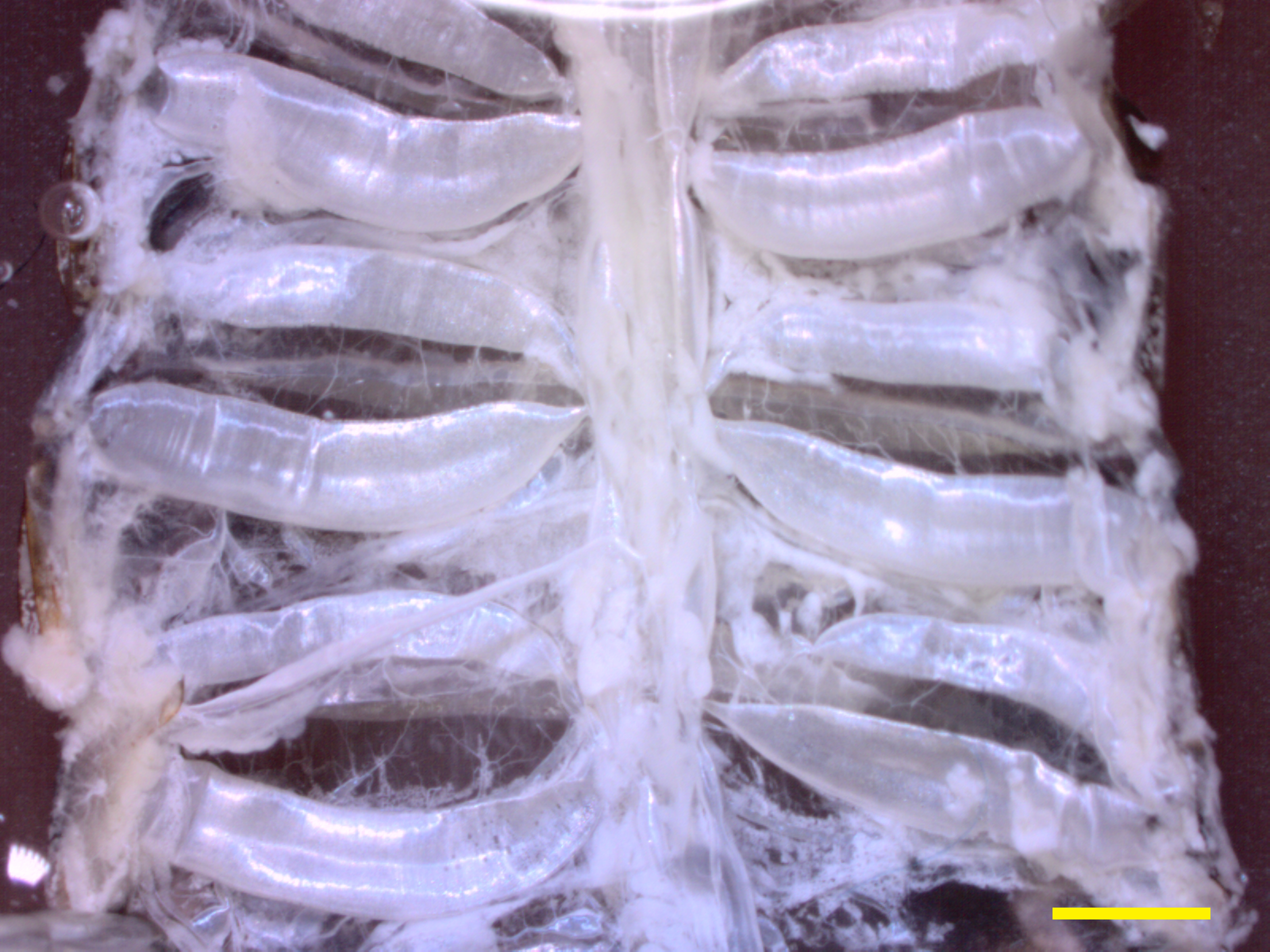
Tracheal system of dissected cockroach. The largest tracheae run across the width of the body of the cockroach and are horizontal in this image. Scale bar, 2 mm.

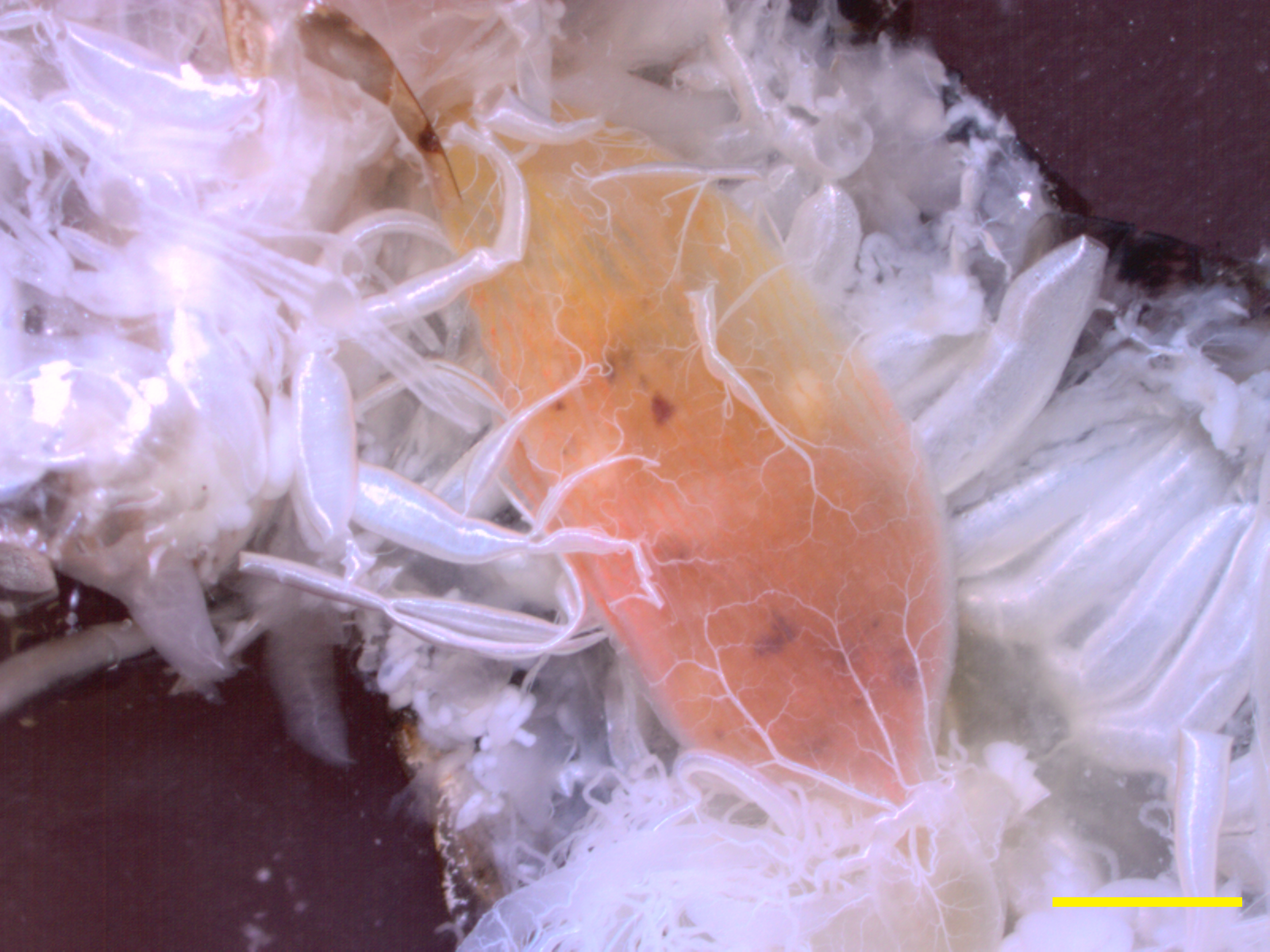
The tracheal system branches into progressively smaller tubes, here supplying the crop of the cockroach. Scale bar, 2.0 mm.

One type of invertebrate respiratory system is the open respiratory system composed of spiracles, tracheae, and tracheoles that terrestrial arthropods have to transport metabolic gases to and from tissues. The distribution of spiracles can vary greatly among the many orders of insects, but in general each segment of the body can have only one pair of spiracles, each of which connects to an atrium and has a relatively large tracheal tube behind it. The tracheae are invaginations of the cuticular exoskeleton that branch (anastomose) throughout the body with diameters from only a few micrometres up to 0.8 mm. The smallest tubes, tracheoles, penetrate cells and serve as sites of diffusion for water, oxygen, and carbon dioxide. Gas may be conducted through the respiratory system by means of active ventilation or passive diffusion. Unlike vertebrates, insects do not generally carry oxygen in their haemolymph.

A tracheal tube may contain ridge-like circumferential rings of taenidia in various geometries such as loops or helices. In the head, thorax, or abdomen, tracheae may also be connected to air sacs. Many insects, such as grasshoppers and bees, which actively pump the air sacs in their abdomen, are able to control the flow of air through their body. In some aquatic insects, the tracheae exchange gas through the body wall directly, in the form of a gill, or function essentially as normal, via a plastron. Despite being internal, the tracheae of arthropods are shed during moulting (ecdysis).

==== Hearing ====
Only vertebrate animals have ears, though many invertebrates detect sound using other kinds of sense organs. In insects, tympanal organs are used to hear distant sounds. They are located either on the head or elsewhere, depending on the insect family. The tympanal organs of some insects are extremely sensitive, offering acute hearing beyond that of most other animals. The female cricket fly Ormia ochracea has tympanal organs on each side of her abdomen. They are connected by a thin bridge of exoskeleton and they function like a tiny pair of eardrums, but, because they are linked, they provide acute directional information. The fly uses her "ears" to detect the call of her host, a male cricket. Depending on where the song of the cricket is coming from, the fly's hearing organs will reverberate at slightly different frequencies. This difference may be as little as 50 billionths of a second, but it is enough to allow the fly to home in directly on a singing male cricket and parasitise it.

Simpler structures allow other arthropods to detect near-field sounds. Spiders and cockroaches, for example, have hairs on their legs, which are used for detecting sound.

Caterpillars of the Monarch butterfly have shown behavioral responses to airborne vibration (sound). Experiments have shown that the detection of sound is received through a pair of 450 micrometre long hairs called trichoid sensilla located on their upper prothorax. Response has been shown to the flight sounds of insect predators and parasitoids.

=== Reproduction ===
Like vertebrates, most invertebrates reproduce at least partly through sexual reproduction. They produce specialized reproductive cells that undergo meiosis to produce smaller, motile spermatozoa or larger, non-motile ova. These fuse to form zygotes, which develop into new individuals. Others are capable of asexual reproduction, or sometimes, both methods of reproduction.

Extensive research with model invertebrate species such as Drosophila melanogaster and Caenorhabditis elegans has contributed much to our understanding of meiosis and reproduction. However, beyond the few model systems, the modes of reproduction found in invertebrates show incredible diversity. In one extreme example, it is estimated that 10% of orbatid mite species have persisted without sexual reproduction and have reproduced asexually for more than 400 million years.

==== Reproductive systems ====
Invertebrates have an extremely diverse array of reproductive systems, the only commonality may be that they all lay eggs. Also, aside from cephalopods and arthropods, nearly all other invertebrates exhibit external fertilization.

=== Social interaction ===
Social behavior is widespread in invertebrates, including cockroaches, termites, aphids, thrips, ants, bees, Passalidae, Acari, spiders, and more. Social interaction is particularly salient in eusocial species but applies to other invertebrates as well.

Insects recognize information transmitted by other insects.

=== Phyla ===
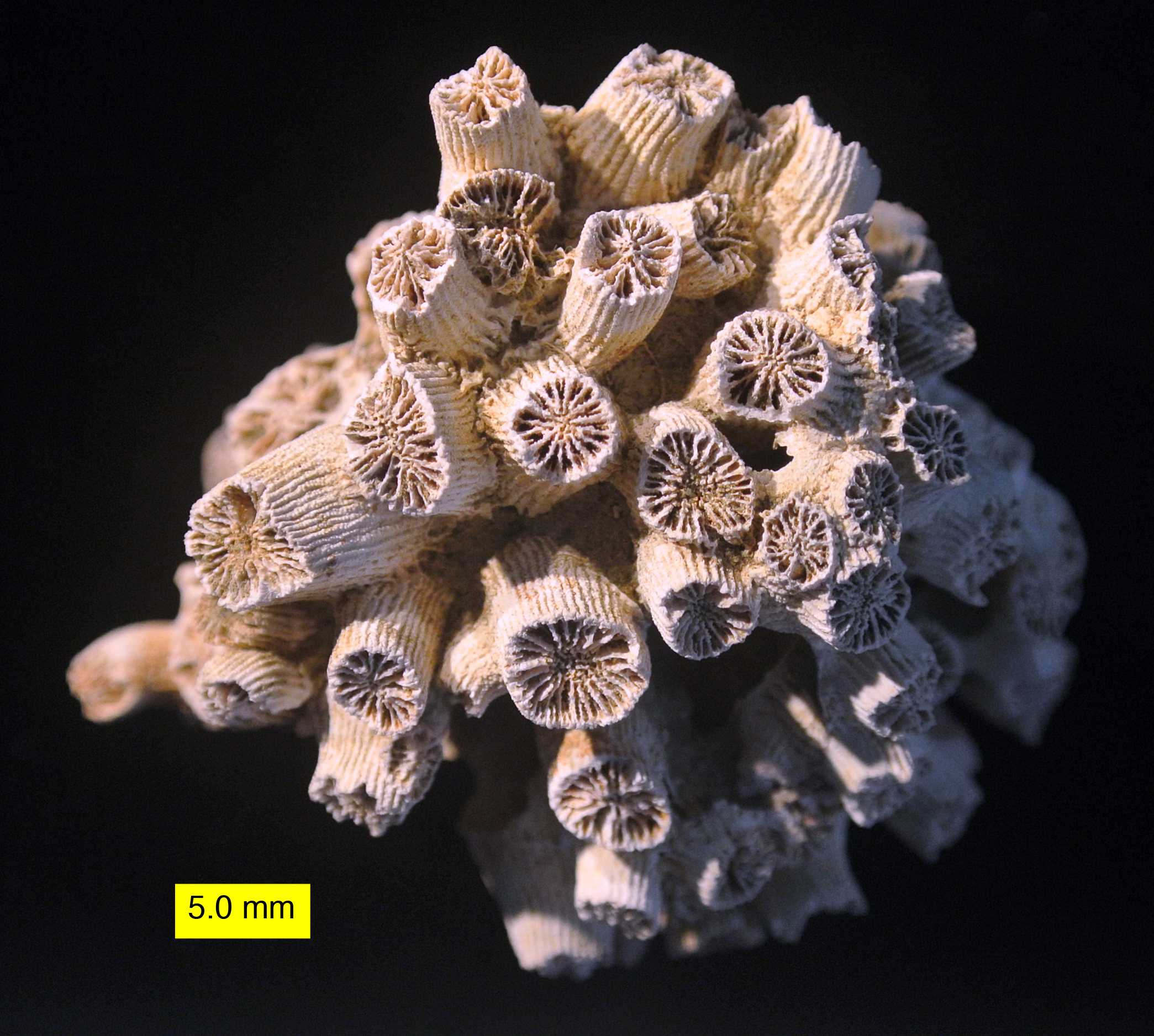
The fossil coral Cladocora from the Pliocene of Cyprus

The term invertebrates covers several phyla. One of these are the sponges (Porifera). They were long thought to have diverged from other animals early. They lack the complex organization found in most other phyla. Their cells are differentiated, but in most cases not organized into distinct tissues. Sponges typically feed by drawing in water through pores. Some speculate that sponges are not so primitive, but may instead be secondarily simplified. The Ctenophora and the Cnidaria, which includes sea anemones, corals, and jellyfish, are radially symmetric and have digestive chambers with a single opening, which serves as both the mouth and the anus. Both have distinct tissues, but they are not organized into organs. There are only two main germ layers, the ectoderm and endoderm, with only scattered cells between them. As such, they are sometimes called diploblastic.

The Echinodermata are radially symmetric and exclusively marine, including starfish (Asteroidea), sea urchins, (Echinoidea), brittle stars (Ophiuroidea), sea cucumbers (Holothuroidea) and feather stars (Crinoidea).

The largest animal phylum is also included within invertebrates: the Arthropoda, including insects, spiders, crabs, and their kin. All these organisms have a body divided into repeating segments, typically with paired appendages. In addition, they possess a hardened exoskeleton that is periodically shed during growth. Two smaller phyla, the Onychophora and Tardigrada, are close relatives of the arthropods and share some traits with them, excluding the hardened exoskeleton. The Nematoda, or roundworms, are perhaps the second largest animal phylum, and are also invertebrates. Roundworms are typically microscopic, and occur in nearly every environment where there is water. A number are important parasites. Smaller phyla related to them are the Kinorhyncha, Priapulida, and Loricifera. These groups have a reduced coelom, called a pseudocoelom. Other invertebrates include the Nemertea, or ribbon worms, and the Sipuncula.

Another phylum is Platyhelminthes, the flatworms. These were originally considered primitive, but it now appears they developed from more complex ancestors. Flatworms are acoelomates, lacking a body cavity, as are their closest relatives, the microscopic Gastrotricha. The Rotifera, or rotifers, are common in aqueous environments. Invertebrates also include the Acanthocephala, or spiny-headed worms, the Gnathostomulida, Micrognathozoa, and the Cycliophora.

Also included are two of the most successful animal phyla, the Mollusca and Annelida. The former, which is the second-largest animal phylum by number of described species, includes animals such as snails, clams, and squids, and the latter comprises the segmented worms, such as earthworms and leeches. These two groups have long been considered close relatives because of the common presence of trochophore larvae, but the annelids were considered closer to the arthropods because they are both segmented. Now, this is generally considered convergent evolution, owing to many morphological and genetic differences between the two phyla.

Among lesser phyla of invertebrates are the Hemichordata, or acorn worms, and the Chaetognatha, or arrow worms. Other phyla include Acoelomorpha, Brachiopoda, Bryozoa, Entoprocta, Phoronida, and Xenoturbellida.

== Classification ==
Invertebrates can be classified into several main categories, some of which are taxonomically obsolescent or debatable, but still used as terms of convenience. Each however appears in its own article at the following links.

- Sponges (Porifera)
- Comb jellies (Ctenophora)
- Medusozoans and corals (Cnidaria)
- Acoels (Xenacoelomorpha)
- Flatworms (Platyhelminthes)
- Bristleworms, earthworms and leeches (Annelida)
- Insects, springtails, crustaceans, myriapods, chelicerates (Arthropoda)
- Chitons, snails, slugs, bivalves, tusk shells, cephalopods (Mollusca)
- Roundworms or threadworms (Nematoda)
- Rotifers (Rotifera)
- Tardigrades (Tardigrada)
- Scalidophorans (Scalidophora)
- Lophophorata
- Velvet worms (Onychophora)
- Arrow worms (Chaetognatha)
- Gordian worms or horsehair worms (Nematomorpha)
- Ribbon worms (Nemertea)
- Placozoa
- Loricifera
- Starfishes, sea urchins, sea cucumbers, sea lilies and brittle stars (Echinodermata)
- Acorn worms, cephalodiscids and graptolites (Hemichordata)
- Lancelets (Amphioxiformes)
- Salps, pyrosomes, doliolids, larvaceans and sea squirts (Tunicata)
- Cycliophora
- Acanthocephala
- Bryozoa
- Priapulida
- Brachiopoda
- Dicyemida
- Entoprocta
- Gnathostomulid
- Lobopodia
- Kinorhyncha
- Micrognathozoa
- Orthonectida
- Petalonamae
- Phoronid
- Proarticulata
- Saccorhytida
- Gastrotrich
- Trilobozoa
- Vetulicolia
- Limnognathia (Micrognathozoa)

An informal classification of invertebrates between macroinvertebrates, which can be seen with the naked eye, and microinvertebrates which cannot be seen by the unaided eye is used for convenience. The line is arbitrarily drawn at a length of about 1 mm.

== History ==
The earliest animal fossils are of invertebrates. 665-million-year-old fossils in the Trezona Formation at Trezona Bore, West Central Flinders, South Australia have been interpreted as being early sponges. Some paleontologists suggest that animals appeared much earlier, possibly as early as 1 billion years ago though they probably became multicellular in the Tonian. Trace fossils such as tracks and burrows found in the late Neoproterozoic Era indicate the presence of triploblastic worms, roughly as large (about 5 mm wide) and complex as earthworms.

Around 453 MYA, animals began diversifying, and many of the important groups of invertebrates diverged from one another. Fossils of invertebrates are found in various types of sediment from the Phanerozoic. Fossils of invertebrates are commonly used in stratigraphy.

=== Classification ===
Carl Linnaeus divided these animals into only two groups, the Insecta and the now-obsolete Vermes (worms). Jean-Baptiste Lamarck, who was appointed to the position of "Curator of Insecta and Vermes" at the Muséum National d'Histoire Naturelle in 1793, both coined the term "invertebrate" to describe such animals and divided the original two groups into ten, by splitting Arachnida and Crustacea from the Linnean Insecta, and Mollusca, Annelida, Cirripedia, Radiata, Coelenterata and Infusoria from the Linnean Vermes. They are now classified into over 30 phyla, from simple organisms such as sea sponges and flatworms to complex animals such as arthropods and molluscs.

==== Significance ====
Invertebrates are animals without a vertebral column. This has led to the conclusion that invertebrates are a group that deviates from the normal, vertebrates. This has been said to be because researchers in the past, such as Lamarck, viewed vertebrates as a "standard": in Lamarck's theory of evolution, he believed that characteristics acquired through the evolutionary process involved not only survival, but also progression toward a "higher form", to which humans and vertebrates were closer than invertebrates were. Although goal-directed evolution has been abandoned, the distinction of invertebrates and vertebrates persists to this day, even though the grouping has been noted to be "hardly natural or even very sharp." Another reason cited for this continued distinction is that Lamarck created a precedent through his classifications which is now difficult to escape from. It is also possible that some humans believe that, they themselves being vertebrates, the group deserves more attention than invertebrates. In any event, in the 1968 edition of Invertebrate Zoology, it is noted that "division of the Animal Kingdom into vertebrates and invertebrates is artificial and reflects human bias in favor of man's own relatives." The book also points out that the group lumps a vast number of species together, so that no one characteristic describes all invertebrates. In addition, some species included are only remotely related to one another, with some more related to vertebrates than other invertebrates (see Paraphyly).

== In research ==
For many centuries, invertebrates were neglected by biologists, in favor of big vertebrates and "useful" or charismatic species. Invertebrate biology was not a major field of study until the work of Linnaeus and Lamarck in the 18th century. During the 20th century, invertebrate zoology became one of the major fields of natural sciences, with prominent discoveries in the fields of medicine, genetics, palaeontology, and ecology. The study of invertebrates has also benefited law enforcement, as arthropods, and especially insects, were discovered to be a source of information for forensic investigators.

Two of the most commonly studied model organisms nowadays are invertebrates: the fruit fly Drosophila melanogaster and the nematode Caenorhabditis elegans. They have long been the most intensively studied model organisms, and were among the first life-forms to be genetically sequenced. This was facilitated by the severely reduced state of their genomes, but many genes, introns, and linkages have been lost. Analysis of the starlet sea anemone genome has emphasised the importance of sponges, placozoans, and choanoflagellates, also being sequenced, in explaining the arrival of 1,500 ancestral genes unique to animals. Invertebrates are also used by scientists in the field of aquatic biomonitoring to evaluate the effects of water pollution and climate change.

== See also ==
- Invertebrate zoology
- Invertebrate paleontology
- Marine invertebrates
- Pain in invertebrates
