= Penis fencing =

Mating ritual in hermaphroditic flatworms

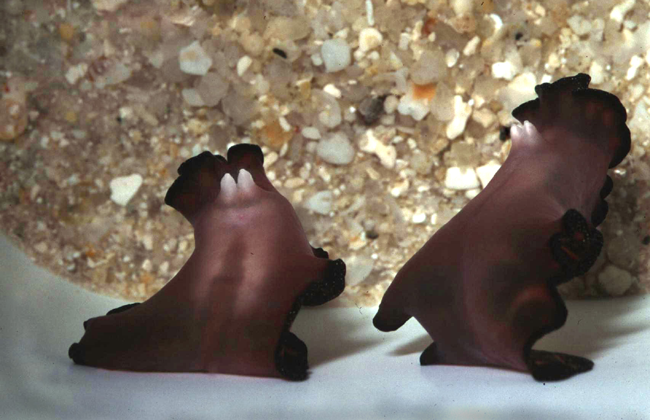
Two flatworms of the species Pseudobiceros bedfordi preparing for penis fencing. P. bedfordi is exceptional in that it applies sperm onto the partner's skin rather than injecting it.

Penis fencing is a mating behavior engaged in by many species of flatworm, such as Pseudobiceros hancockanus. Species which engage in the practice are hermaphroditic; each individual has both egg-producing ovaries and sperm-producing testes.

The flatworms "fence" using extendable two-headed dagger-like stylets. These stylets are pointed (and in some species hooked) in order to pierce their mate's epidermis and inject sperm into the haemocoel in an act known as intradermal hypodermic insemination, or traumatic insemination. Pairs can either compete, with only one individual transferring sperm to the other, or the pair can transfer sperm bilaterally. Both forms of sperm transfer can occur in the same species, depending on various factors.

== Unilateral sperm transfer ==
One organism will inseminate the other, with the inseminating individual being the father. The sperm is absorbed through pores or sometimes wounds in the skin from the partner's stylet, causing fertilization in the other, who becomes the mother. The battle may last for up to an hour in some species.

Parturition, while necessary for successful offspring production, requires a considerable parental investment in time and energy, and according to Bateman's principle, almost always burdens the mother. Thus, from an optimality model it is usually preferable for an organism to inseminate than to be inseminated. However, in many species that engage in this form of copulatory competition, each father will continue to fence with other partners until it is inseminated. In Alderia modesta, individuals will store sperm from several "fencing matches" before laying their eggs, and smaller individuals will more often inseminate a larger partner, with larger individuals spending more energy on laying eggs when paired with a smaller partner on the occasion that they transfer sperm unilaterally.

In the absence of potential mates, some species such as Neobenedenia melleni are capable of reproducing through self-insemination.

== Bilateral sperm transfer ==
Commonly, many hermaphroditic species mutually inseminate, or trade sperm, rather than compete, Chelidonura sandrana as an example. The tiger flatworm, Maritigrella crozieri, also transfers sperm bilaterally. In many species that engage in bilateral insemination, sperm trading is conditional. If one partner "cheats", and does not transfer sperm, the other partner will either prematurely abandon the partner, or will engage in typical mating behavior without transferring sperm. Other species will alternate which partner transfers sperm, engaging in multiple bouts of fencing with the same partner over time. In A. modesta, bilateral sperm transfer is the most common, especially in similarly sized mate pairs.

== Other uses ==
The term is also applied, usually informally, to homosexual activity between two males among bonobos; same-sex genital-genital rubbing is used in bonobo society to cement bonds, reduce conflict, and express communal excitement over food. Several whale species also engage in penis fencing.

== See also ==
- Frot
- Love dart
- Sexual conflict
- Traumatic insemination
