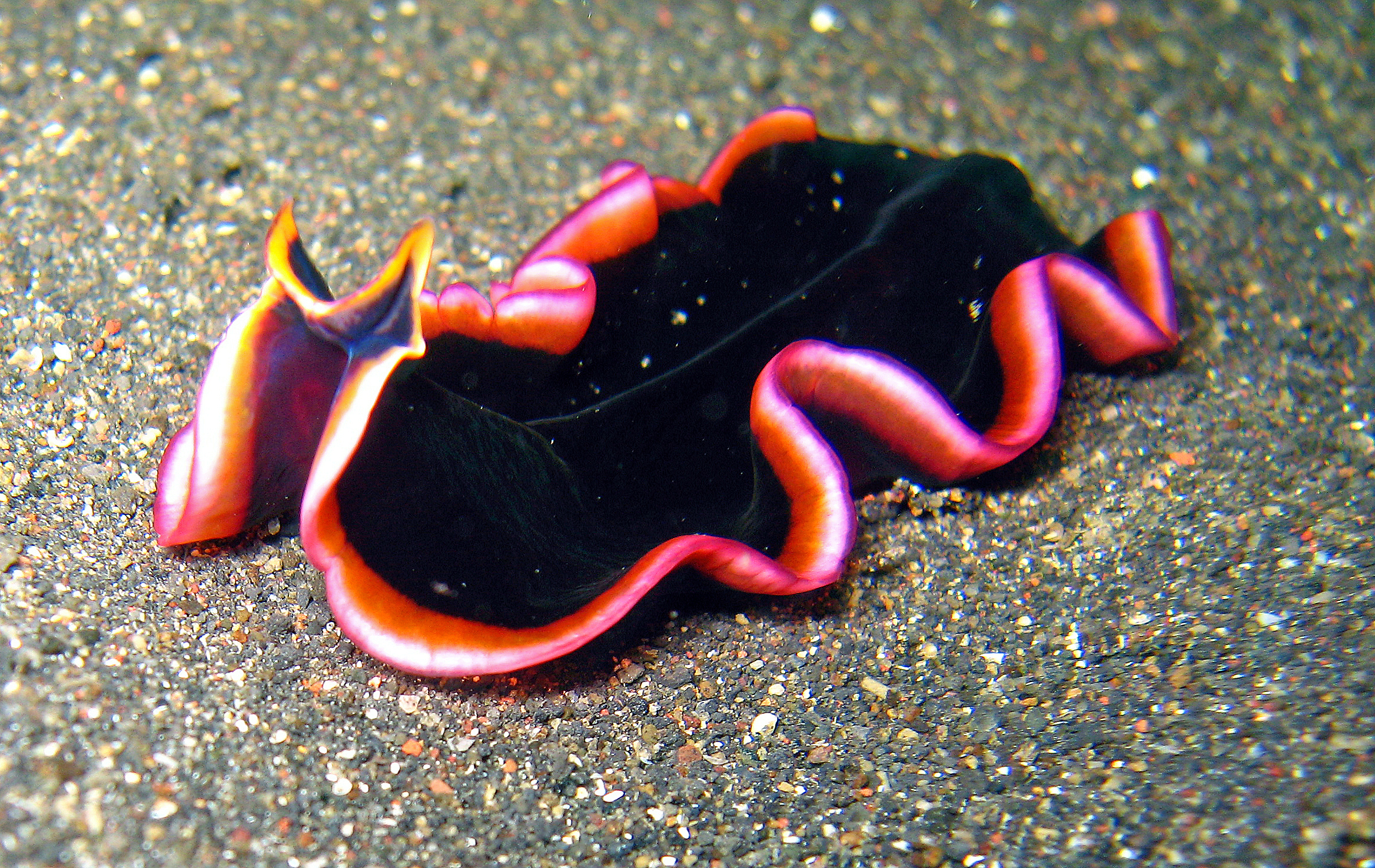

Scientific classification
- Kingdom: Animalia
- Phylum: Platyhelminthes
- Order: Polycladida
- Suborder: Cotylea
- Family: Pseudocerotidae
- Genus: Pseudobiceros
- Species: P. hancockanus

Binomial name
- Pseudobiceros hancockanus (Collingwood, 1876)

= Pseudobiceros hancockanus =

Species of flatworm

Pseudobiceros hancockanus is a species of hermaphroditic marine flatworm in the family Pseudocerotidae. It is also known as Hancock's flatworm.

== Description ==
According to the Baensch Marine Atlas, "P. hancockanus is intense blue to black with white and orange peripheral bands and a purple fringe. The two short cephalic antennaie are easily overlooked because they are the same color as the body. Inferiorly, this species is purple with a medial line." P. hancockanus is very similar in appearance to P. uniarborensis, although the margin of P. uniarborensis is translucent gray with a white line only on the outside, while the margin of P. hancockanus is pure bright white. It can grow up to 14 cm (5.5 inch) in length.

== Habitat and distribution ==
Pseudobiceros hancockanus lives in warm seas, sometimes on coral reefs, other times among coral fragments or stones. It has been observed near places such as Indonesia, Fiji, and Kenya.

== Diet ==
It is thought to feed on small invertebrates that live in sponges in coral reefs rather than eating the coral itself.

== Behavior ==
Pseudobiceros hancockanus can travel long distances, swimming by undulating the edges of its body.

== Reproduction ==
Like other members of the genus Pseudobiceros, P. hancockanus is hermaphroditic with each individual able to function as either a male or female. Mating between two such worms involves penis fencing, as each worm tries to inject sperm into the other with one of its two stubby penises, while trying to avoid being inseminated itself. One explanation advanced for this behavior is that the female role entails more investment in the resulting fertilized eggs. Another possible explanation is that the duel awards mating advantage to the better of two dueling partners—so that the penis duel's loser, becoming the "female," is compensated by creating offspring with genes even better than hers.
