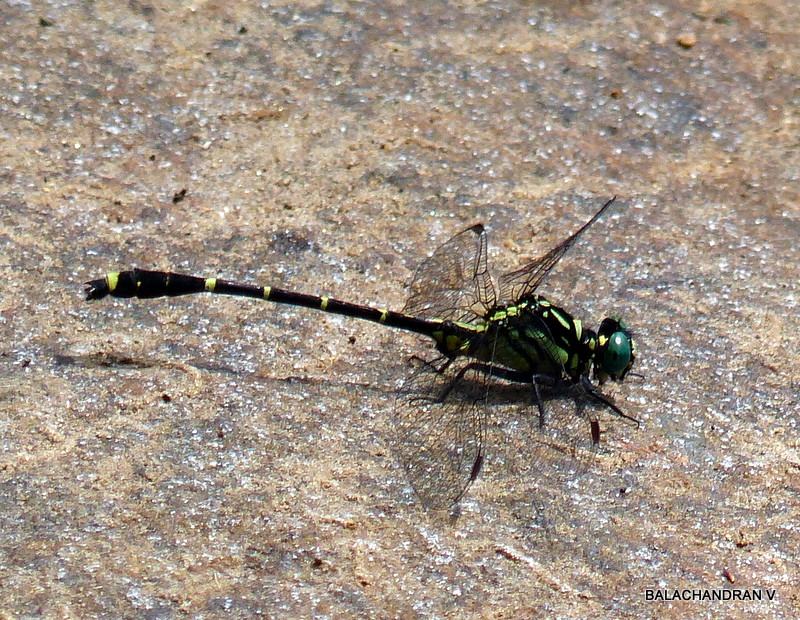
- Male

Conservation status
- Data Deficient (IUCN 3.1)

Scientific classification
- Kingdom: Animalia
- Phylum: Arthropoda
- Class: Insecta
- Order: Odonata
- Infraorder: Anisoptera
- Family: Gomphidae
- Genus: Burmagomphus
- Species: B. laidlawi

Binomial name
- Burmagomphus laidlawi Fraser, 1924

= Burmagomphus laidlawi =

Species of dragonfly

Burmagomphus laidlawi is a species of dragonfly in the family Gomphidae. It is known only from the high altitude regions of Western Ghats of India.

== Description and habitat ==
It is a medium-sized dragonfly with bottle-green eyes. Its thorax is black, marked with greenish-yellow ante-humeral stripes. Sides are greenish-yellow, marked with two narrow black stripes. Wings are transparent, slightly tinted with yellow at bases. Abdomen is black, marked with yellow. Segment 1 and 2 have broad dorsal stripes, and its sides. Segment 3 has a mid-dorsal carina of yellow, and a large baso-lateral spot. Segment 4 to 6 have basal dorsal triangular spots and baso-lateral lunules. Segment 7 has a broad basal ring. Segment 8 is unmarked. Segment 9 has its apical half yellow. Segment 10 is unmarked. Anal appendages are black. Female is similar to the male.

It breeds in montane forest streams and rivers.

== See also ==
- List of odonates of India
- List of odonata of Kerala
