= Frank Fortescue Laidlaw =

British biologist

Frank Fortescue Laidlaw (1876–1963) was a British biologist, working particularly in the fields of entomology, herpetology, and malacology.

Laidlaw named a number of species of snails, including the land snail genus Colparion Earlier in his career he studied dragonflies, the Odonata, identifying a number of new species, and being himself recorded in names such as Epiophlebia laidlawi Tillyard, 1921 and Burmagomphus laidlawi Fraser, 1924. He described two new species of snakes: Hebius inas and Kolpophis annandalei.

== Bibliography ==
- Laidlaw FF (1901). "List of a Collection of Snakes, Crocodiles, and Chelonians from the Malay Peninsula, made by Members of the “Skeat Expedition,” 1899–1900". Proceedings of the Zoological Society of London 1901 (2): 575-583 + Plate XXXV.
- Laidlaw FF (1915). "Contributions to a study of the dragonfly fauna of Borneo - Part III". Proc. Zool. Soc. London 1915: 25-39.
- Laidlaw FF (1931). "On a new sub-family Dyakiinae of the Zonitidae". Proceedings of the Malacological Society of London 19: 190-201. abstract.
- Laidlaw FF (1932). "Notes on Ariophantidæ from the Malay Peninsula, with descriptions of new genera". Proc. Malacological Soc. London 20: 80-94.
- Laidlaw FF (1934). "A note on the dragonfly fauna of (Odonata) of Mount Kinabalu and some other mountain areas of Malaysia, with a description of some new or little known species". Journal of the Federated Malay States Museums 17 (3), 549-561.
