= Gieysztoria =

Scientific classification
- Kingdom: Animalia
- Phylum: Platyhelminthes
- Order: Rhabdocoela
- Family: Dalyelliidae
- Genus: Gieysztoria; Ruebush & Hayes, 1939

Genus of flatworms

Gieysztoria is a genus of Platyhelminthes belonging to the family Dalyelliidae, and within this family it is the genus with the highest numbers of species (approximately 75 species) and the widest distribution.

The genus has cosmopolitan distribution, and mainly inhabits freshwaters.

== Species ==
- Gieysztoria acariaia Marcus, 1946
- Gieysztoria ashokae Van Steenkiste, Van Mulken & Artois, 2012
- Gieysztoria atalaya Brusa, Damborenea & Norena, 2008
- Gieysztoria bellis Marcus, 1946
- Gieysztoria beltrani (Gieysztor, 1931)
- Gieysztoria bergi (Beklemischev, 1927)
- Gieysztoria billabongensis Jondelius, 1997
- Gieysztoria bimaculata Wang, Lu & Wu, 2013
- Gieysztoria chiqchi Damborenea, Brusa & Norena, 2005
- Gieysztoria chlynovica (Nasonov, 1919)
- Gieysztoria choctaw Van Steenkiste, Gobert & Artois, 2011
- Gieysztoria coronae Noreña-Janssen, 1995
- Gieysztoria cuspidata (Schmidt, 1861)
- Gieysztoria cypris Marcus, 1946
- Gieysztoria diadema (Hofsten, 1907)
- Gieysztoria donnae Young, 1977
- Gieysztoria duopunctata Reyes & Brusa, 2021
- Gieysztoria euchroa (Gieysztor, 1926)
- Gieysztoria evelinae Marcus, 1946
- Gieysztoria expedita (Hofsten, 1907)
- Gieysztoria expeditoides Luther, 1955
- Gieysztoria falx Brusa, Damborenea & Noreña, 2003
- Gieysztoria faubeli Artois, Willems, De Roeck, Jocque & Brendonck, 2004
- Gieysztoria foreli (Hofsten, 1911)
- Gieysztoria garudae Van Steenkiste, Van Mulken & Artois, 2012
- Gieysztoria guangdongensis Wang & Xia, 2013
- Gieysztoria hermes Reyes & Brusa, 2021
- Gieysztoria huizhouensis Zhang, Wu & Wang, 2014
- Gieysztoria hymanae Marcus, 1946
- Gieysztoria iberica Van Steenkiste, Tessens, Krznaric & Artois, 2011
- Gieysztoria infundibuliformis (Fuhrmann, 1894)
- Gieysztoria intricata Marcus, 1946
- Gieysztoria isoldeae Artois, Willems, De Roeck, Jocque & Brendonck, 2005
- Gieysztoria italica Luther, 1955
- Gieysztoria japonica (Okugawa, 1930)
- Gieysztoria joannae Young, 1977
- Gieysztoria kasasapa Damborenea, Brusa & Norena, 2005
- Gieysztoria knipovici (Beklemischev, 1953)
- Gieysztoria koiwi (Eggers, 1924)
- Gieysztoria kolasai Young, 1977
- Gieysztoria lugubris (Reisinger, 1924)
- Gieysztoria macrovariata (Weise, 1942)
- Gieysztoria maritima Luther, 1955
- Gieysztoria matilde Brusa, Damborenea & Norena, 2008
- Gieysztoria minima (Riedel, 1932)
- Gieysztoria multiovata Luther, 1955
- Gieysztoria namuncurai Damborenea, Brusa & Noreña, 2007
- Gieysztoria octospinosa Luther, 1955
- Gieysztoria okugawai (Ruebush & Hayes, 1939)
- Gieysztoria oligocentra (Steinböck, 1948)
- Gieysztoria ornata (Hofsten, 1907)
- Gieysztoria oryzae (Nasonov, 1929)
- Gieysztoria papii Young, 1977
- Gieysztoria pavimentata (Beklemischev, 1926)
- Gieysztoria pisana Kolasa, 1981
- Gieysztoria pseudoblodgetti Luther, 1955
- Gieysztoria pseudodiadema Norena-Janssen, 1995
- Gieysztoria pulchra Wang & Deng, 2006
- Gieysztoria qixingyanensis Wang & Rong, 2016
- Gieysztoria quadrata Norena-Janssen, 1995
- Gieysztoria quadridens (Böhmig, 1898)
- Gieysztoria quadridensoides (Fuhrmann, 1914)
- Gieysztoria queenslandica Hochberg & Cannon, 2001
- Gieysztoria ramayana Van Steenkiste, Van Mulken & Artois, 2012
- Gieysztoria reggae Therriault & Kolasa, 1999
- Gieysztoria rubra (Fuhrmann, 1894)
- Gieysztoria saganae Young, 1977
- Gieysztoria santafeensis Norena-Janssen, 1995
- Gieysztoria sasa Damborenea, Brusa & Norena, 2005
- Gieysztoria shantouensis Zhang, Li & Wang, 2014
- Gieysztoria shenzhensis Wang & Wu, 2005
- Gieysztoria shiyanensis Wang & Xia, 2014
- Gieysztoria sibirica (Plotnikow, 1905)
- Gieysztoria stokesi Van Steenkiste & Artois, 2012
- Gieysztoria subsalsa Luther, 1955
- Gieysztoria superba Hartenstein & Dwine, 2000
- Gieysztoria taurica (Nasonov, 1923)
- Gieysztoria therapaina Marcus, 1946
- Gieysztoria thienemanni (Reisinger, 1933)
- Gieysztoria thymara Marcus, 1946
- Gieysztoria tigrensis Norena-Janssen, 1995
- Gieysztoria tridesma Marcus, 1946
- Gieysztoria triquetra (Fuhrmann, 1894)
- Gieysztoria trisolena Marcus, 1946
- Gieysztoria uncia Marcus, 1946
- Gieysztoria variata Noreña-Janssen, 1995
- Gieysztoria virgulifera (Plotnikow, 1906)
- Gieysztoria wuyishanensis Wang & Lai, 2013
- Gieysztoria zuluensis Van Steenkiste & Artois, 2012

== Distribution ==
=== The neotropical region ===
Within the Neotropical region, Gieysztoria is the most specious genus, with 24 described species. These taxa exhibit differences in male stylet morphology compared to their European counterparts, with Neotropical species showing greater structural complexity. Other genera in this region are poorly represented: Dalyellia (one species), Microdalyellia (three species), and Sergia (one species).

=== Argentina ===
In Argentina, seven species of Gieysztoria have been recorded: G. santafeensis, G. quadrata, G. coronae, G. tigrensis, G. pseudodiadema, G. variata, and G. falx. Additionally, a single species of Microdalyellia (M. fairchildi) and one species of Dalyellia (D. obscura) are known.
