= Baicalellia daftpunka =

Scientific classification
- Kingdom: Animalia
- Phylum: Platyhelminthes
- Order: Rhabdocoela
- Family: Provorticidae
- Genus: Baicalellia
- Species: B. daftpunka

Binomial name
- Baicalellia daftpunka Stephenson et al., 2018

Species of flatworm

Baicalellia daftpunka is a species of rhabdocoel flatworm. They were first found in Clover Point, a park in Victoria, British Columbia. The specific name comes from the electronic music duo Daft Punk, known for their signature helmets; their name reflects their helmet-shaped stylets.

They are small, around 0.5-0.8mm long, and transparent, with two small eyes. They have a barrel shaped pharynx ringed with around 26 tentacles, and eat a diet composed of small organisms, including diatoms.

== See also ==
- List of organisms named after famous people (born 1950–1974)
- List of organisms named after famous people (born 1975–present)
