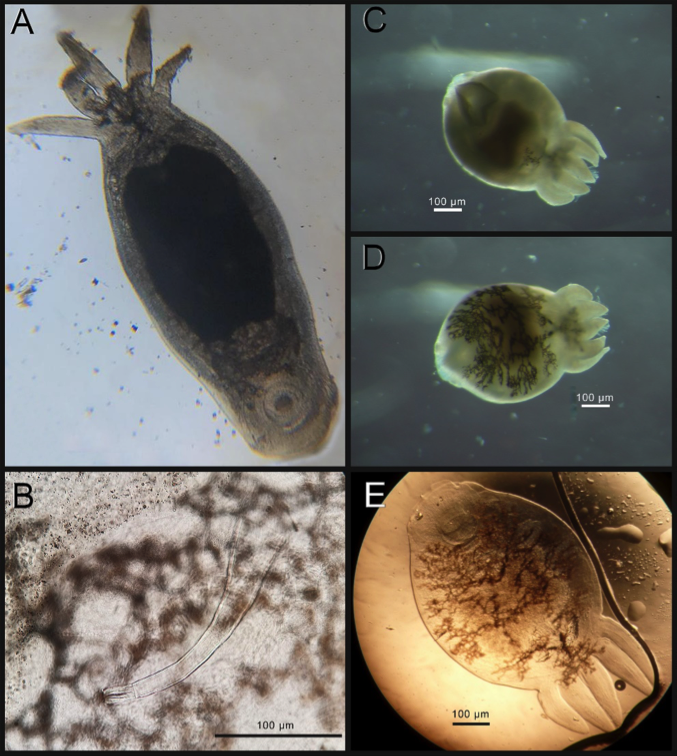
- Temnosewellia minor

Scientific classification
- Kingdom: Animalia
- Phylum: Platyhelminthes
- Order: Rhabdocoela
- Family: Temnocephalidae
- Subfamily: Temnocephalinae
- Genus: Temnosewellia; Damborenea & Cannon, 2001

Type species
- Temnocephala minor Haswell, 1888

Diversity
- 52 species, see text

= Temnosewellia =

Genus of rhabdocoel worms

Temnosewellia is a genus of rhabdocoel worms in the family Temnocephalidae, native to Australia and parts of Asia. Members of this genus are ectosymbionts on usually freshwater crustaceans, although some are known from terrestrial hosts. Reaching up to 10 millimetres (0.39 in) in length, they are characterized by five anterior tentacles and a posterior adhesive disk, used for locomotion.

== Taxonomy and history ==
The genus Temnosewellia was erected by Cristina Damborenea and Lester Robert Glen Cannon in 2001 to accommodate 15 Australian species formerly placed in the genus Temnocephala, with Temnocephala minor as the type species. A 2006 review described 31 additional species, all found in association with Euastacus crayfish.

== Ecology ==
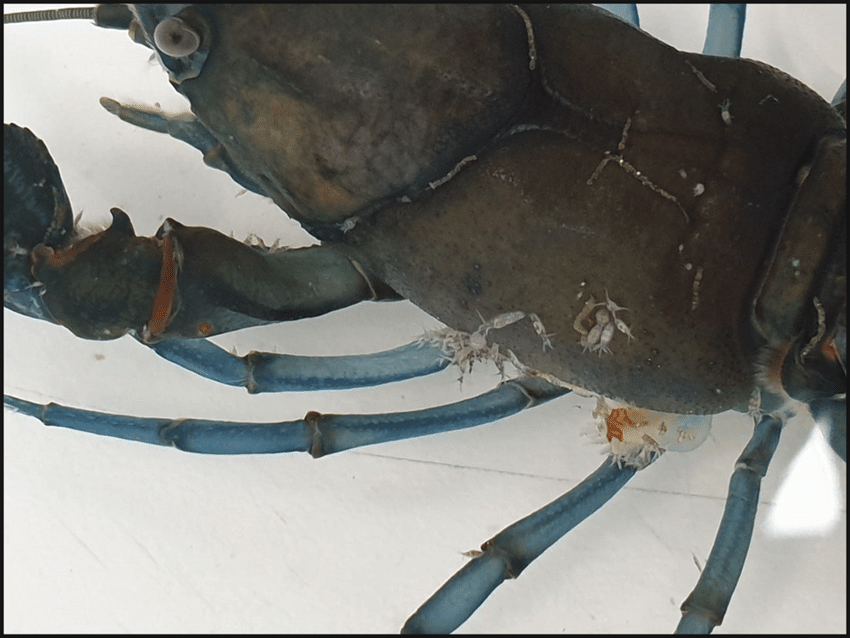
T. minor on the surface of a common yabby (Cherax destructor)

Temnosewellia species are specialised ectosymbionts associated with freshwater crustaceans, typically occurring on the external surface of the host or within its branchial chambers. Many species are known to occur only on a single host species, with known hosts including species of shrimp (Caridina, Paratya, and Macrobrachium), crayfish (Cherax, Engaeus, Euastacus, and Parastacoides), crabs (Holthuisana, Villopotamon), and isopods (Phreatoicopsis). Of the 52 described Temnosewellia species, 32 are known from crayfishes in the genus Euastacus. Some species are known to be capable of switching hosts, including to non-native host species, with T. minor having been documented in cultivation on Pontastacus leptodactylus in Turkey and Germany and on Potamonautes warreni in South Africa.

A few species occur on terrestrial hosts, namely T. caeca and T. geonoma on the burrowing isopod Phreatoicopsis terricola, and T. engaei on the land crayfish Engaeus fossor.

== Distribution ==
Most Temnosewellia species are known from Australia. Four species are native to temperate and tropical environments in Asia. Of these, T. semperi has the widest range, spanning from South to East Asia, while T. rouxi is known from Aru Island in Indonesia, T. vietnamensis from Quảng Nam, Vietnam, and a still undescribed T. aff. vietnamensis from Kagoshima, Japan. Due to the variety of potential hosts in these regions, it is possible that the species diversity of Temnosewellia has been greatly underestimated. Imported specimens of T. chaeropsis have been found in South Africa, while imported specimens of T. minor have been reported in Germany, Italy, Japan, Turkey, and South Africa.

== Evolutionary history ==
A 2016 Bayesian phylogeny using molecular clock dating places the internal divergence of the genus at 106 Ma, during the Cretaceous period, close to the divergence of the widespread Australian host genus Euastacus. Cophylogenetic correlations between host and symbiont indicate a shared evolutionary history across the five main clades of Temnosewellia species in Australia. The northernmost and earliest-diverging of these clades, which is estimated to have split 58 million years ago, maps onto two distinct clades of Euastacus forming a paraphyletic grade, providing evidence of host-switching.

A 2023 study found the genus to be polyphyletic, and recovered four distinct clades scattered throughout Temnocephalinae.

== Description ==
Members of Temnosewellia are small worms growing to approximately 10 mm (0.39 in) long. They are characterised by having five anterior tentacles, a posterior adhesive disc, and an epidermis composed of five syncytial plates: an anterior tentacular plate, a single saddle-like post-tentacular plate, a body plate, a peduncular plate, and a posterior adhesive disc plate. The body and peduncular plates are split into dorsal and ventral sections by a shallow groove. A single pair of eyes is present at the base of the tentacles. They may also exhibit some dark pigmentation in the body and/or eyes and lack any conspicuous ridges on the tentacles or body. The excretory pore is located on the body plate. Locomotion utilises the anterior tentacles and posterior adhesive disc in a looping leech-like motion. Eggs are laid on the surface of the host, and development is direct.

== Species ==
The genus Temnosewellia includes 52 species:

- Temnosewellia acicularis Sewell, Cannon & Blair, 2006
- Temnosewellia acirra Cannon & Sewell, 2001
- Temnosewellia alba Sewell, Cannon & Blair, 2006
- Temnosewellia albata Sewell, Cannon & Blair, 2006
- Temnosewellia aphyodes Sewell, Cannon & Blair, 2006
- Temnosewellia apiculus Sewell, Cannon & Blair, 2006
- Temnosewellia arga Sewell, Cannon & Blair, 2006
- Temnosewellia argeta Sewell, Cannon & Blair, 2006
- Temnosewellia argilla Sewell, Cannon & Blair, 2006
- Temnosewellia aspinosa Sewell, Cannon & Blair, 2006
- Temnosewellia aspra Sewell, Cannon & Blair, 2006
- Temnosewellia athertonensis (Cannon, 1993)
- Temnosewellia bacrio Sewell, Cannon & Blair, 2006
- Temnosewellia bacrioniculus Sewell, Cannon & Blair, 2006
- Temnosewellia batiola Sewell, Cannon & Blair, 2006
- Temnosewellia belone Sewell, Cannon & Blair, 2006
- Temnosewellia butlerae (Cannon, 1993)
- Temnosewellia caeca (Haswell, 1900)
- Temnosewellia caliculus Sewell, Cannon & Blair, 2006
- Temnosewellia cestus Sewell, Cannon & Blair, 2006
- Temnosewellia chaeropsis (Hett, 1925)
- Temnosewellia christineae Cannon & Sewell, 2001
- Temnosewellia cita (Hickman, 1967)
- Temnosewellia comythus Sewell, Cannon & Blair, 2006
- Temnosewellia coughrani Sewell, Cannon & Blair, 2006
- Temnosewellia cypellum Sewell, Cannon & Blair, 2006
- Temnosewellia dendyi Haswell, 1893
- Temnosewellia engaei (Haswell, 1893)
- Temnosewellia fasciata (Haswell, 1887)
- Temnosewellia fax Sewell, Cannon & Blair, 2006
- Temnosewellia flammula Sewell, Cannon & Blair, 2006
- Temnosewellia geonoma (Williams, 1980)
- Temnosewellia gingrina Sewell, Cannon & Blair, 2006
- Temnosewellia gracilis Sewell, Cannon & Blair, 2006
- Temnosewellia improcera (Cannon, 1993)
- Temnosewellia keras Sewell, Cannon & Blair, 2006
- Temnosewellia maculata Sewell, Cannon & Blair, 2006
- Temnosewellia magna Sewell, Cannon & Blair, 2006
- Temnosewellia maxima Sewell, Cannon & Blair, 2006
- Temnosewellia minima Sewell, Cannon & Blair, 2006
- Temnosewellia minor (Haswell, 1887)
- Temnosewellia minuta (Cannon, 1993)
- Temnosewellia muscalingulata Sewell, Cannon & Blair, 2006
- Temnosewellia neqae (Cannon, 1993)
- Temnosewellia phantasmella Cannon & Sewell, 2001
- Temnosewellia possibilitas Sewell, Cannon & Blair, 2006
- Temnosewellia punctata Cannon & Sewell, 2001
- Temnosewellia queenslandensis (Cannon, 1993)
- Temnosewellia rouxi (Merton, 1913)
- Temnosewellia semperi (Weber, 1889)
- Temnosewellia unguiculus Sewell, Cannon & Blair, 2006
- Temnosewellia vietnamensis Damborenea & Brusa, 2009
