= Mariplanellidae =

Scientific classification
- Kingdom: Animalia
- Phylum: Platyhelminthes
- Order: Rhabdocoela
- Suborder: Mariplanellida
- Family: Mariplanellidae; Ax & Heller, 1970

Genera
- Lonchoplanella; Mariplanella; Poseidoplanella

Family of flatworms

Mariplanellidae is a family of rhabdocoel flatworms. It is the only family in the suborder Mariplanellida.

== Description ==
Species of Mariplanellidae are characterized by a pharynx rosulatus (rosette-shaped pharynx), paired testes and vitellaria, but an unpaired ovary. The female system has two connections between the ovary and the common genital atrium: an efferent connection (female duct) that carries the eggs from the ovaries to the common genital atrium, and an afferent connection (including the bursa, the muscular spermatic duct, the seminal receptacle, and the insemination duct), where sperm is stored after mating and moves towards the eggs for fertilization.

== Classification ==
Mariplanellidae was originally considered a subfamily, Mariplanellinae, of Trigonostomidae, a family in the suborder Dalytyphloplanida. This classification was based on the shared presence of two connections between the ovaries and the common genital atrium. However, other species in Trigonostomidae have two ovaries instead of one, which made their position in this family uncertain. Later, molecular studies confirmed that Mariplanellidae and Trigonostomidae are not closely related, and Mariplanellidae is the sister group of the remaining members of Rhabdocoela, which led to the erection of a new suborder, Mariplanellida, to accommodate it.
