= Cicerina elegans =

Scientific classification
- Kingdom: Animalia
- Phylum: Platyhelminthes
- Order: Rhabdocoela
- Family: Cicerinidae
- Genus: Cicerina
- Species: C. elegans

Binomial name
- Cicerina elegans (Evdonin, 1971)

Synonyms
- Paracicerina elegans Evdonin, 1971

Species of worm

Cicerina elegans is a species of flatworms in the class Rhabditophora. It is an interstitial species from the Peter the Great Gulf in far eastern Russia.
