= Gandalfia =

Scientific classification
- Kingdom: Animalia
- Phylum: Platyhelminthes
- Order: Rhabdocoela
- Family: Trigonostomidae
- Genus: Gandalfia; Willems, Artois, Vermin, Backeljau & Schockaert, 2005
- Species: G. bilunata

Binomial name
- Gandalfia bilunata Willems, Artois, Vermin, Backeljau & Schockaert, 2005

Genus of flatworms

Gandalfia is a monotypic genus of flatworms belonging to the family Trigonostomidae. The only species is Gandalfia bilunata.

The species is found in Indian Ocean.
