= Dalyellia viridis =

Scientific classification
- Domain: Eukaryota
- Kingdom: Animalia
- Phylum: Platyhelminthes
- Order: Rhabdocoela
- Family: Dalyelliidae
- Genus: Dalyellia
- Species: D. viridis

Binomial name
- Dalyellia viridis (Shaw, 1791)

Flatworm

Dalyellia viridis is a species of rhabdocoel flatworm in the family Dalyelliidae.

== Description ==
The animal is usually colored intensively green due to zoochlorellae. It is 2.5 to 4 mm long with a rounded anterior and pointed posterior end. It possesses a pair of kidney-shaped eyes. Mature animals carry many eggs in their body.

== Taxonomy ==
It was described in 1791 by George Shaw as Hirudo viridis.

== Distribution and habitat ==
It occurs in freshwater in stagnant waterbodies. It is most frequently found in temporary pools.

== Ecology and behavior ==
The animal harbors symbiotic green algae (zoochlorellae) of the species Chlorella vulgaris in its body. It feeds on algae and animals, including microturbellarians.
