= Provortex =

Scientific classification
- Kingdom: Animalia
- Phylum: Platyhelminthes
- Order: Rhabdocoela
- Family: Provorticidae
- Genus: Provortex; Graff, 1882

Genus of flatworms

Provortex is a genus of flatworms belonging to the family Provorticidae.

The species of this genus are found in Europe.

Species:

- Provortex affinis (Jensen, 1878)
- Provortex balticus (Schultze, 1851)
