= Polycystididae =

Scientific classification
- Kingdom: Animalia
- Phylum: Platyhelminthes
- Order: Rhabdocoela
- Suborder: Kalyptorhynchia
- Infraorder: Eukalyptorhynchia
- Family: Polycystididae; Graff, 1905

Family of flatworms

Polycystididae is a family of flatworms belonging to the order Rhabdocoela.

== Genera ==
Genera:

- Acrorhynchides (Strand, 1928)
- Alcha (Marcus, 1949)
- Alchoides (Willems, Schockaert & Artois, 2006)
- Ametochus (Willems, Schockaert & Artois, 2006)
- Annalisella (Karling, 1978)
- Annulorhynchus (Karling, 1956)
- Antiboreorhynchus (Karling, 1952)
- Arrawarria (Willems, Schockaert & Artois, 2006)
- Austrorhynchus (Karling, 1952)
- Bermudorhynchus (Karling, 1978)
- Brachyrhynchoides (Artois, Willems, Reygel & Schockaert, 2013)
- Brunetorhynchus (Schockaert, Martens, Revis, Janssen, Willems & Artois, 2014)
- Cincturorhynchus (Evdonin, 1970)
- Danorhynchus (Karling, 1955)
- Djeziraia (Schockaert, 1971)
- Duplacrorhynchus (Schockaert & Karling, 1970)
- Duplexostylus (Willems, Schockaert & Artois, 2006)
- Fungorhynchus (Karling, 1952)
- Galapagorhynchus (Artois & Schockaert, 1999)
- Gallorhynchus (Schockaert & Brunet, 1971)
- Gemelliclinus (Evdonin, 1970)
- Graffiellus (Hornung, 2016)
- Gyratricella (Karling, 1955)
- Gyratrix (Ehrenberg, 1831)
- Hawadlia (Schockaert, 1971)
- Koinocystella (Karling, 1952)
- Lagenopolycystis (Artois & Schockaert, 2000)
- Limipolycystis (Schilke, 1970)
- Marcusia (Artois & Schockaert, 1998) (Note: Junior homonym of Marcusia (polycladid))
- Megaloascos (Evdonin, 1970)
- Myobulla (Artois & Schockaert, 2000)
- Neopolycystis (Karling, 1955)
- Opisthocystis (Sekera, 1911)
- Palladia (Evdonin, 1977)
- Papia (Karling, 1956)
- Parachrorhynchus (Karling, 1956)
- Paraustrorhynchus (Karling & Schockaert, 1977)
- Paulodora (Marcus, 1948)
- Phonorhynchella (Karling, 1956)
- Phonorhynchoides (Beklemischev, 1927)
- Phonorhynchopsis (Willems & Artois, 2017)
- Phonorhynchus (Graff, 1905)
- Polycydora (Diez, Sanjuan, Reygel & Artois, 2018)
- Polycystis (Kölliker, 1845)
- Porrocystis (Reisinger, 1926)
- Progyrator (Sekera, 1901)
- Psammopolycystis (Meixner, 1938)
- Pseudorogneda (Wang & Xie, 2020)
- Pygmorhynchus (Artois & Schockaert, 1999)
- Rogneda (Uljanin, 1870)
- Rostracilla (Rundell & Leander, 2014)
- Sabulirhynchus (Artois & Schockaert, 2000)
- Scanorhynchus (Karling, 1955)
- Stradorhynchus (Willems, Schockaert & Artois, 2006)
- Thinodactylaina (Rundell & Leander, 2014)
- Triaustrorhynchus (Willems, Schockaert & Artois, 2006)
- Typhlopolycystis (Karling, 1956)
- Yaquinaia (Schockaert & Karling, 1970)
