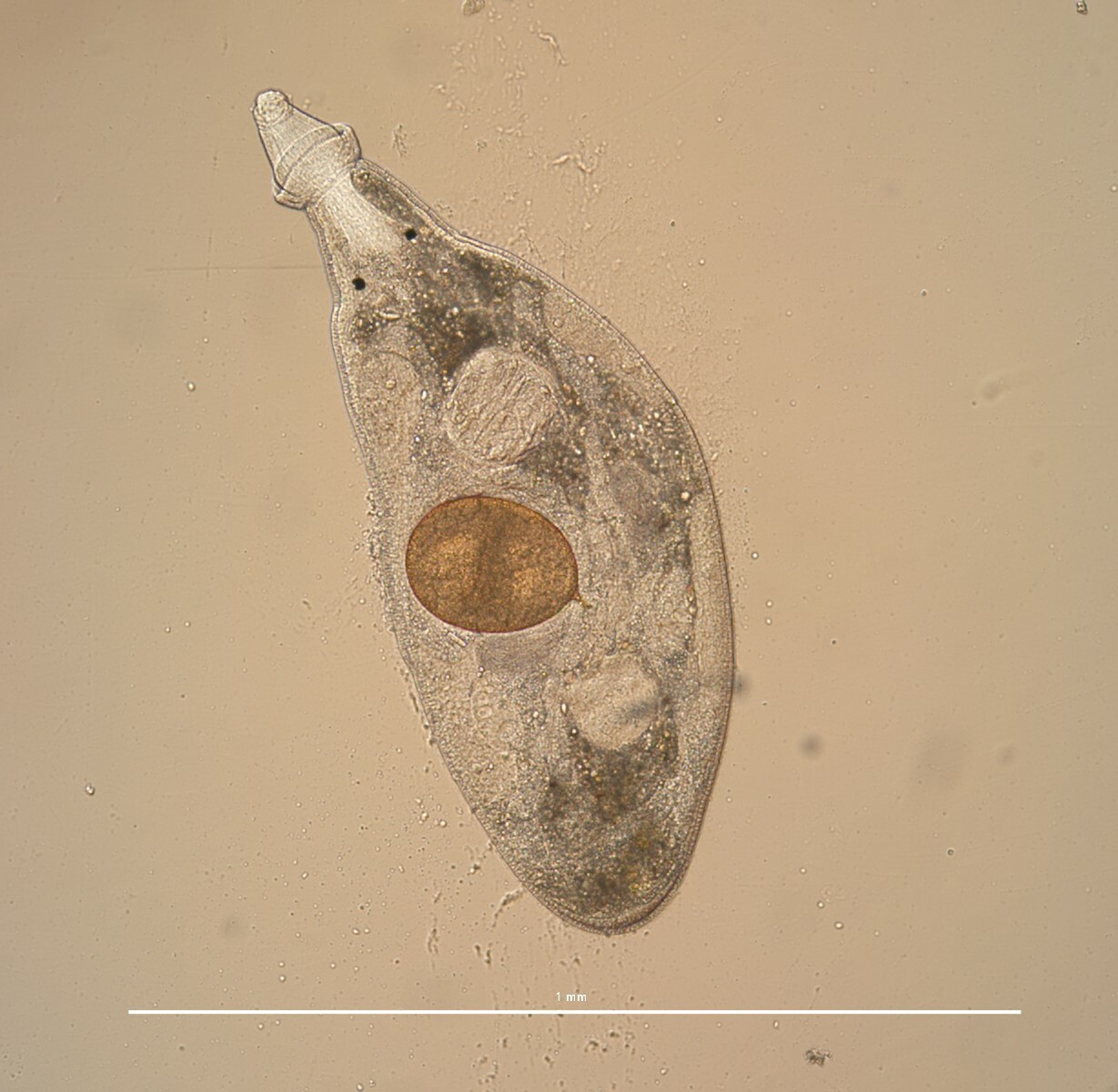
- Undescribed Paulodora sp. from Fort Pierce Florida

Scientific classification
- Kingdom: Animalia
- Phylum: Platyhelminthes
- Order: Rhabdocoela
- Family: Polycystididae
- Subfamily: Polycystidinae
- Genus: Paulodora; Marcus, 1948

= Paulodora =

Genus of flatworms

Paulodora is a genus of Rhabdocoela flatworms in the family Polycystididae.

== Species ==
There are 17 described species.

- Paulodora ancora Artois & Tessens, 2008
- Paulodora artoisi Van Steenkiste & Leander, 2018
- Paulodora asymmetrica Artois & Schockaert, 2001
- Paulodora contorta (Schockaert & Karling, 1975) Artois & Schockaert, 1998
- Paulodora contortoides Artois & Tessens, 2008
- Paulodora dolichocephala (Pereyaslawzewa, 1892) Artois & Schockaert, 1998
- Paulodora drepanophora Artois & Tessens, 2008
- Paulodora felis (Marcus, 1954) Artois & Schockaert, 1998
- Paulodora fredelyna (Marcus, 1948) Artois & Schockaert, 1998
- Paulodora hamifer Artois & Tessens, 2008
- Paulodora matarazzoi Marcus, 1948
- Paulodora porcellus Artois & Tessens, 2008
- Paulodora riedli (Karling, 1956) Artois & Schockaert, 1998
- Paulodora schockaerti Artois & Tessens, 2008
- Paulodora sinensis Wang & Zhong, 2018
- Paulodora subcontorta (Schockaert, 1982) Artois & Schockaert, 1998
- Paulodora watsoni Artois & Tessens, 2008
