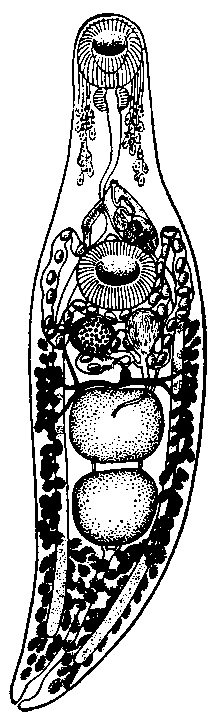

Scientific classification
- Kingdom: Animalia
- Phylum: Platyhelminthes
- Class: Trematoda
- Order: Plagiorchiida
- Family: Allocreadiidae
- Genus: Allocreadium
- Species: A. isoporum

Binomial name
- Allocreadium isoporum (Looss, 1894) Looss, 1900

= Allocreadium isoporum =

Species of fluke

Allocreadium isoporum is a species of Trematoda belonging to the family Allocreadiidae. It is native to Europe and Northern America.
