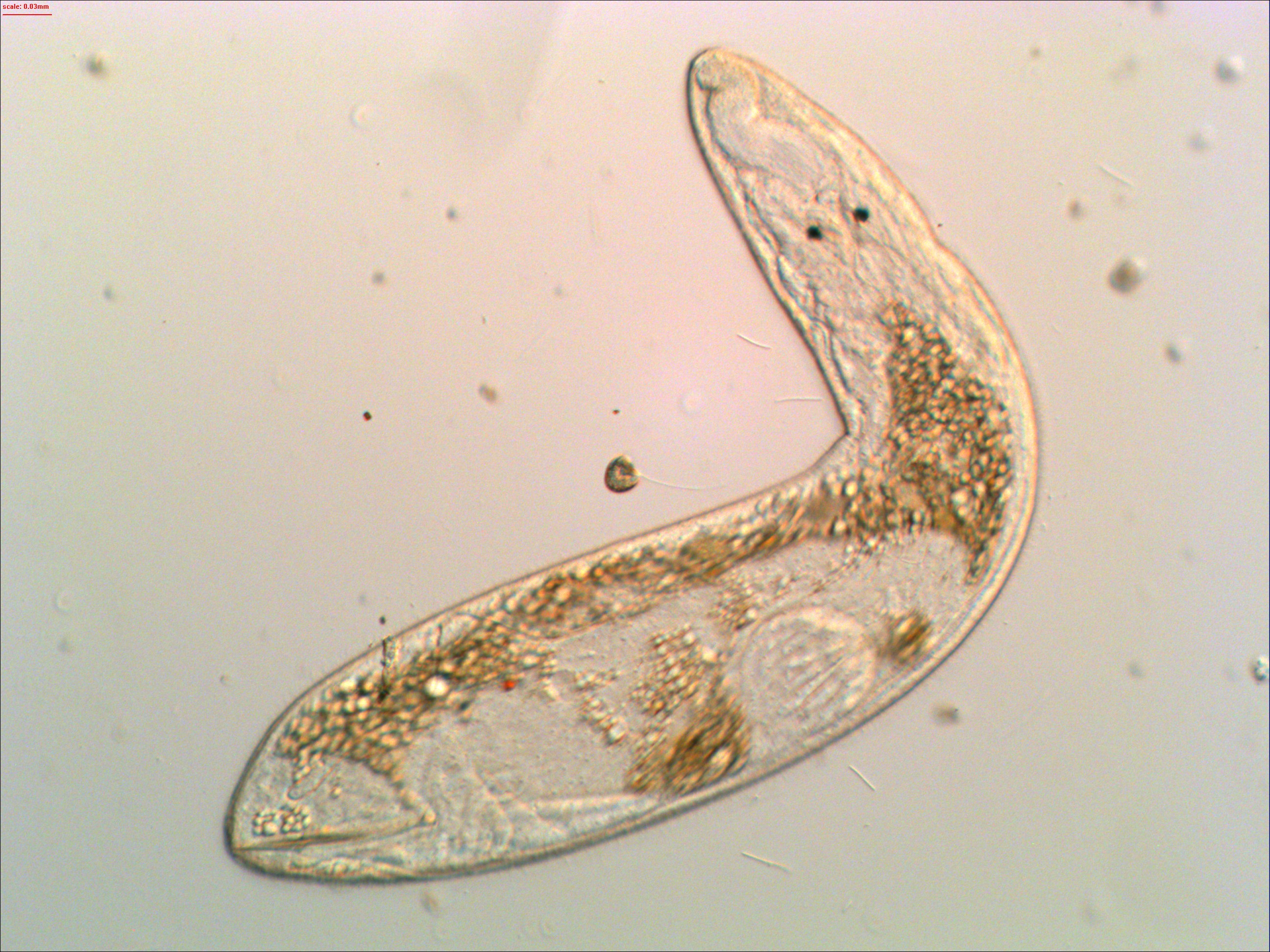
- Gyratrix hermaphroditus, a member of Eukalyptorhynchia

Scientific classification
- Domain: Eukaryota
- Kingdom: Animalia
- Phylum: Platyhelminthes
- Order: Rhabdocoela
- Suborder: Kalyptorhynchia
- Infraorder: Eukalyptorhynchia; Meixner, 1928

Subgroups
- Aculeorhynchidae; Bertiliellidae; Crassicolidae; Cystiplanidae; Cytocystididae; Gnathorhynchidae; Koinocystididae; Nannorhynchididae; Placorhynchidae; Polycystididae; Psammorhynchidae; Rhynchokarlingiidae; Zonorhynchus

= Eukalyptorhynchia =

Infraorder of flatworms

Eukalyptorhynchia is an infraorder of flatworms belonging to the order Rhabdocoela. They are characterized by cone-shaped proboscis called conorhynch. The conorhynch is formed by a muscular bulb in a proboscis sheath lined by epithelium.

== Phylogeny ==
A phylogenetic classification including some families of Eukalyptorhynchia is provided below.

- Eukalyptorhynchia
  - Placorhynchidae
  - - Zonorhynchus
    - - Polycystididae
      - Psammorhynchidae
      - - Koinocystididae
        - Cystiplanidae
        - Gnathorhynchidae
