= Temnocephala lamothei =

Scientific classification
- Kingdom: Animalia
- Phylum: Platyhelminthes
- Order: Rhabdocoela
- Family: Temnocephalidae
- Genus: Temnocephala
- Species: T. lamothei

Binomial name
- Temnocephala lamothei Damborenea & Brusa, 2008

Species of flatworm

Temnocephala lamothei is a species of flatworm in the family Temnocephalidae.

The specific name lamothei is in honor of Mexican helminthologist Dr. Marcos Rafael Lamothe-Argumedo.

This species was collected in 2005 in Misiones Province, Argentina and described in 2008 as a commensal in the mantle cavity of freshwater snail Pomella megastoma.
