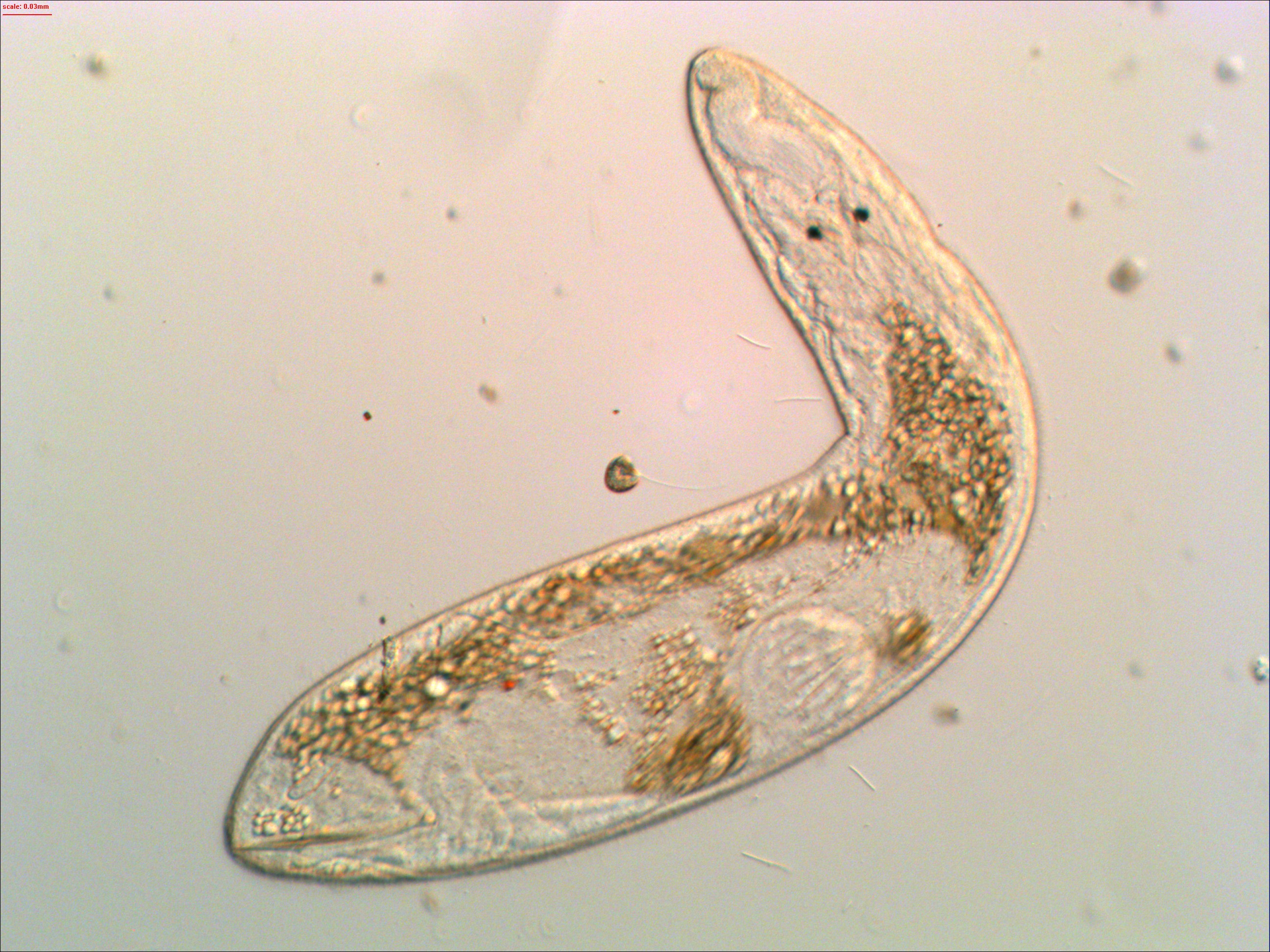

Scientific classification
- Kingdom: Animalia
- Phylum: Platyhelminthes
- Order: Rhabdocoela
- Family: Polycystididae
- Genus: Gyratrix
- Species: G. hermaphroditus

Binomial name
- Gyratrix hermaphroditus Ehrenberg, 1831

= Gyratrix hermaphroditus =

Species of flatworm

Gyratrix hermaphroditus is a species of rhabdocoel flatworm in the family Polycystididae.

== Description ==
The animal is 1 to 1.5 mm long, transparent and colorless. It possesses a proboscis at the anterior end and a sharply pointed stylet.

== Taxonomy ==
It was described by Christian Gottfried Ehrenberg in 1831. Gyratrix hermaphroditus represents a species complex.

== Distribution and habitat ==
Members of the species complex occur in both marine and inland water habitats.

== Ecology and behavior ==
It is known to feed on copepods and cladocerans.
