= Micropalaeosoma =

Micropalaeosoma Temporal range: Eocene

Scientific classification
- Kingdom: Animalia
- Phylum: Platyhelminthes
- Order: Rhabdocoela
- Suborder: Dalytyphloplanida
- Genus: †Micropalaeosoma; Poinar, 2004

Type species
- †Micropalaeosoma balticus (Poinar, 2003)

Extinct genus of flatworms

Micropalaeosoma balticus (formerly Palaeosoma balticus (Note: The name Palaeosoma was preoccupied by a genus of fossil millipedes.)) was reported as an extinct, fossil turbellarian flatworm known from Baltic amber of Kaliningrad, Russia, that lived approximately 40 million years ago. It measured approximately 1.5 mm in length. It was considered the oldest and most complete free-living flatworm body fossil. However, much older flatworm fossils have been reported and it has been re-interpreted as a pseudo-inclusion (largely consisting of air bubbles).
