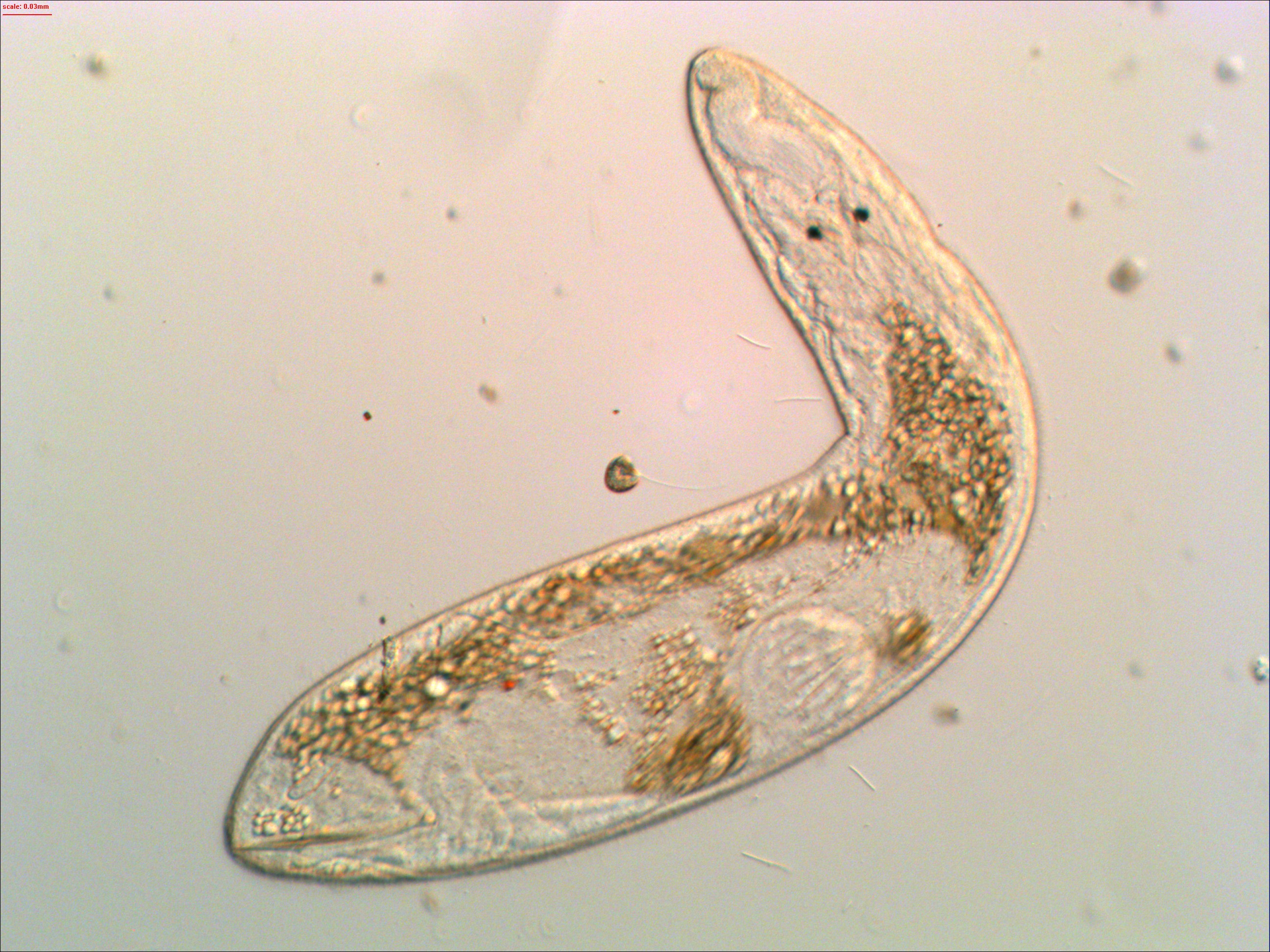
- Gyratrix hermaphroditus

Scientific classification
- Kingdom: Animalia
- Phylum: Platyhelminthes
- Order: Rhabdocoela
- Family: Polycystididae
- Genus: Gyratrix; Ehrenberg, 1831

= Gyratrix =

Genus of flatworms

Gyratrix is a genus of flatworms belonging to the family Polycystididae.

The genus has cosmopolitan distribution.

Species:

- Gyratrix hermaphroditus Ehrenberg, 1831
- Gyratrix proaviformis Karling & Schockaert, 1977
