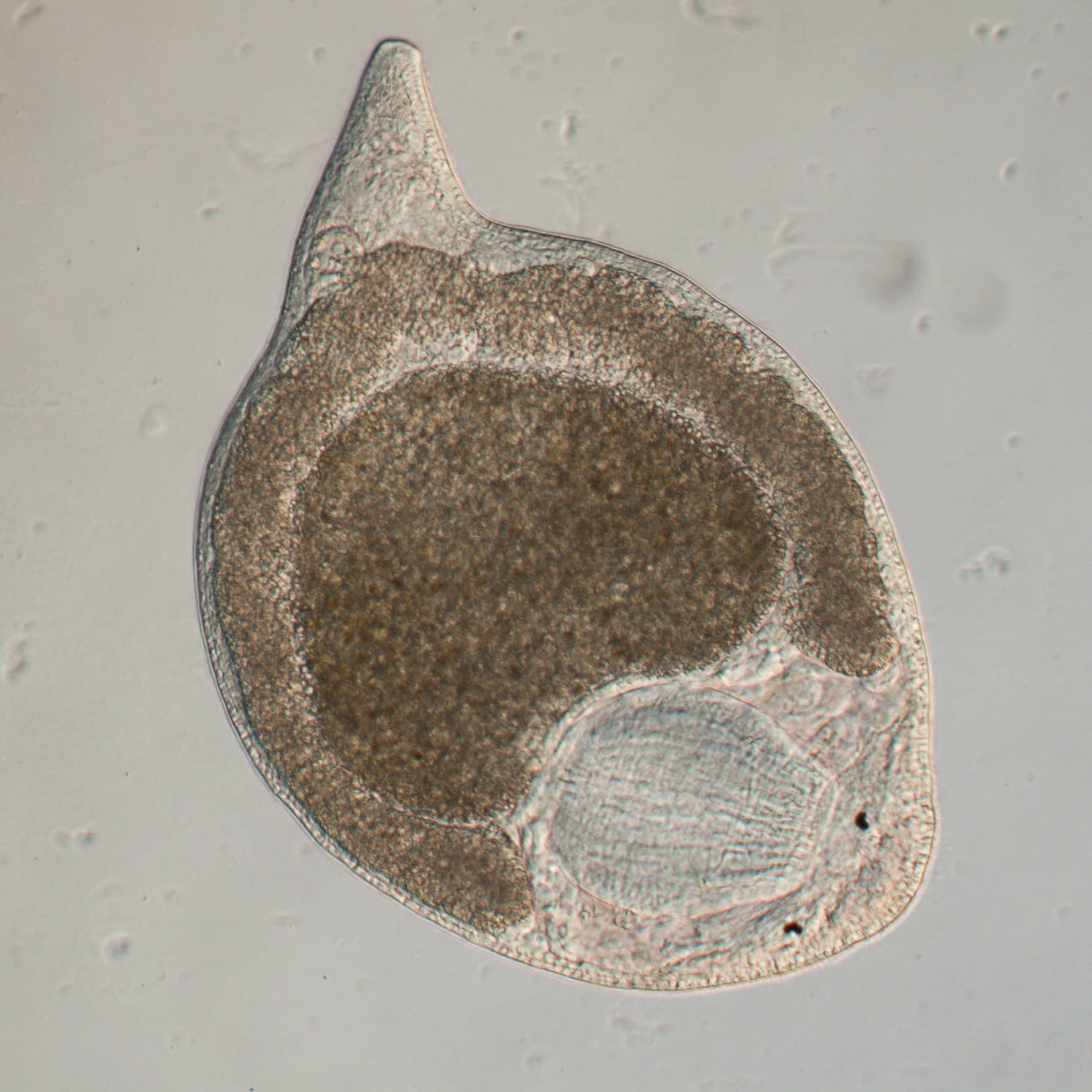
- Dalyelliid flatworm

Scientific classification
- Kingdom: Animalia
- Phylum: Platyhelminthes
- Order: Rhabdocoela
- Parvorder: Limnotyphloplanida
- Family: Dalyelliidae

= Dalyelliidae =

Family of flatworms

Dalyelliidae is a family of flatworms belonging to the order Rhabdocoela. The family Dalyelliidae represents the most diverse group within the Dalyellioida. Although a number of species also inhabit marine and brackish waters, the majority are free-living in freshwater environments. Notably, the only known taxon to exhibit symbiotic habits in a broad sense is the Varsoviella.

== Genera ==
As of 2007, Dalyelliidae included 16 genera, 10 of which are confined to freshwater habitats:

- Austrodalyellia Hochberg & Cannon, 2002
- Castrella Fuhrmann, 1900
- Dalyellia Gieysztor, 1938
- Fulinskiella Gieysztor & Szynal, 1939
- Gieysztoria Ruebush & Hayes, 1939
- Haplodidymos Hochberg & Cannon, 2002
- Microdalyellia Gieysztor, 1938
- Sergia Nasonov, 1923
- Varsoviella, Gieysztor & Wisniewski, 1947
- Vaillantiella Luther, 1955

Other Genera include:

- Alexlutheria Karling, 1956
- Axiola Luther, 1955

Among these, the genera with the highest numbers of species and the widest distribution are Gieysztoria (approximately 75 species), Microdalyellia (42 species), and Dalyellia (11 species), the remaining genera are more limited.

== Distribution ==
=== The neotropical region ===
Within the Neotropical region, Gieysztoria is the most specious genus, with 24 described species. These taxa exhibit differences in male stylet morphology compared to their European counterparts, with Neotropical species showing greater structural complexity. Other genera in this region are poorly represented: Dalyellia (one species), Microdalyellia (three species), and Sergia (one species).

=== Argentina ===
In Argentina, seven species of Gieysztoria have been recorded: G. santafeensis, G. quadrata, G. coronae, G. tigrensis, G. pseudodiadema, G. variata, and G. falx. Additionally, a single species of Microdalyellia (M. fairchildi) and one species of Dalyellia (D. obscura) are known.
