= Baicalellia =

Scientific classification
- Kingdom: Animalia
- Phylum: Platyhelminthes
- Order: Rhabdocoela
- Family: Provorticidae
- Subfamily: Neokirgellinae
- Genus: Baicalellia; Nasonov, 1930

Genus of worms

Baicalellia is a genus of flatworms belonging to the family Provorticidae.

The species of this genus are found in North and South America, Australia and Europe.

== Species ==
Species:

- Baicalellia albicauda Nasonov, 1930
- Baicalellia anchoragensis Ax & Armonies, 1990
- Baicalellia baicali Nasonov, 1930
- Baicalellia beauchampi Stephenson, Van Steenkiste & Leander, 2019
- Baicalellia brevitubus Nasonov, 1930
- Baicalellia canadensis Ax & Armonies, 1987
- Baicalellia daftpunka Stephenson et al., 2018
- Baicalellia evelinae Marcus, 1946
- Baicalellia forcipifera Van Steenkiste, Volonterio, Schockaert & Artois, 2008
- Baicalellia groenlandica Ax, 1995
- Baicalellia maculata Nasonov, 1930
- Baicalellia nana Stephenson, Van Steenkiste & Leander, 2019
- Baicalellia nasonovi Timoshkin & Krivorotkin, 2023
- Baicalellia nigrofasciata Nasonov, 1930
- Baicalellia ocellata Nasonov, 1930
- Baicalellia opaca Ruebush & Hayes, 1939
- Baicalellia pellucida Nasonov, 1930
- Baicalellia posieti Nasonov, 1930
- Baicalellia pusilla Stephenson, Van Steenkiste & Leander, 2019
- Baicalellia rectis Ax, 2008
- Baicalellia sewardensis Ax & Armonies, 1990
- Baicalellia solaris Stephenson, Van Steenkiste & Leander, 2019
- Baicalellia strelzovi Joffe & Selivanova, 1988
- Baicalellia subsalina Ax, 1954
