= Cicerina =

Scientific classification
- Kingdom: Animalia
- Phylum: Platyhelminthes
- Order: Rhabdocoela
- Family: Cicerinidae
- Genus: Cicerina; Giard, 1904

Species
- Cicerina bicirrata Karling, 1989; Cicerina brevicirrus Meixner, 1928; Cicerina debrae Tucker, Stevens & Smith, 2014; Cicerina elegans (Evdonin, 1971); Cicerina eucentrota Ax, 1959; Cicerina remanei Meixner, 1928; Cicerina tetradactyla Giard, 1904; Cicerina triangularis Karling, 1989

Genus of flatworms

Cicerina is a genus of flatworms in the class Rhabditophora.
