= Castrella =

Scientific classification
- Kingdom: Animalia
- Phylum: Platyhelminthes
- Order: Rhabdocoela
- Family: Dalyelliidae
- Genus: Castrella; Fuhrmann, 1900

Genus of worms

Castrella is a genus of flatworms belonging to the family Dalyelliidae.

Species:

- Castrella alba Luther, 1955
- Castrella cylindrica Riedel, 1932
