= Alcha (flatworm) =

Scientific classification
- Kingdom: Animalia
- Phylum: Platyhelminthes
- Order: Rhabdocoela
- Family: Polycystididae
- Subfamily: Polycystidinae
- Genus: Alcha; Marcus, 1949

Genus of worms

Alcha is a worm genus of the Polycystidinae subfamily.
