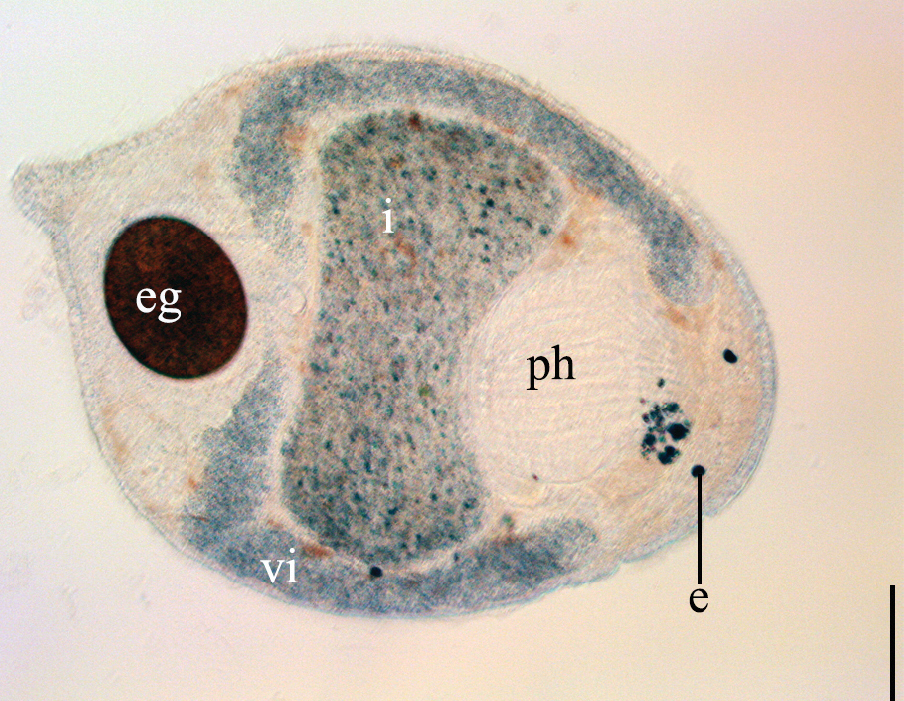
- Microdalyellia schmidtii

Scientific classification
- Kingdom: Animalia
- Phylum: Platyhelminthes
- Order: Rhabdocoela
- Family: Dalyelliidae
- Genus: Microdalyellia; Gieysztor, 1938

= Microdalyellia =

Genus of flatworms

Microdalyellia is a genus of flatworms belonging to the family Dalyelliidae.

The species of this genus are found in Europe and North America.

== Species ==
The following species are recognised in the genus Microdalyellia:

- Microdalyellia abursalis (Ruebush, 1937)
- Microdalyellia arctica (Nasonov, 1923)
- Microdalyellia armigera (Schmidt, 1862)
- Microdalyellia arndti Mead & Kolasa, 1984
- Microdalyellia bicornis (Nasonov, 1926)
- Microdalyellia bipennata Noreña, Campo & Real, 1999
- Microdalyellia biwae (Okugawa, 1930)
- Microdalyellia brevimana (Beklemischev, 1921)
- Microdalyellia brevispina (Hofsten, 1911)
- Microdalyellia circulobursalis (Ruebush, 1937)
- Microdalyellia dastychi Kolasa, 1981
- Microdalyellia dubitativa (Sibiriakova, 1929)
- Microdalyellia erythrocephala (Steinböck, 1949)
- Microdalyellia fairchildi (Graff, 1911)
- Microdalyellia fulcrifera (Weise, 1942)
- Microdalyellia fusca (Fuhrmann, 1894)
- Microdalyellia gilesi Jones & Hayes, 1941
- Microdalyellia graffi (Hallez, 1878)
- Microdalyellia groenlandica (Riedel, 1932)
- Microdalyellia guangdongensis Wang & Rong, 2016
- Microdalyellia henophora (Weise, 1942)
- Microdalyellia hunanensis Wang & Wu, 2008
- Microdalyellia kenyae Young, 1977
- Microdalyellia kupelwieseri (Meixner, 1915)
- Microdalyellia macrobursalis Van der Land, 1965
- Microdalyellia maialis Kolasa, 1979
- Microdalyellia microphthalma (Vejdovsky, 1895)
- Microdalyellia minima (An der Lan, 1939)
- Microdalyellia mohicana (Graff, 1911)
- Microdalyellia mollosovi (Nasonov, 1920)
- Microdalyellia muyuensis Wang & Wu, 2005
- Microdalyellia nanella (Beklemischev, 1921)
- Microdalyellia olsoni Olsoni, 1955
- Microdalyellia paucispinosa (Sekera, 1888)
- Microdalyellia picta (Schmidt, 1848)
- Microdalyellia pugiofera (Weise, 1942)
- Microdalyellia rastafariae Therriault & Kolasa, 1999
- Microdalyellia rheesi (Graff, 1911)
- Microdalyellia rossi (Graff, 1911)
- Microdalyellia ruebushi Olsoni, 1955
- Microdalyellia sawayai Marcus, 1946
- Microdalyellia schmidtii (Graff, 1882)
- Microdalyellia schockaerti Willems, Artois, Jocqué & Brendonck, 2007
- Microdalyellia shennongijiae Wang & Wu, 2005
- Microdalyellia shenzhensis Wang & Wu, 2005
- Microdalyellia sillimani (Graff, 1911)
- Microdalyellia sinensis Wang & Wu, 2005
- Microdalyellia tennesseensis (Ruebush & Hayes, 1939)
- Microdalyellia triseriata Beklemischev, 1950
- Microdalyellia tsurugae (Nasonov, 1929)
- Microdalyellia variospinosa (Fulinski & Szynal, 1933)
- Microdalyellia virginiana (Ruebush, 1937)
