= Allocreadium =

Scientific classification
- Kingdom: Animalia
- Phylum: Platyhelminthes
- Class: Trematoda
- Order: Plagiorchiida
- Family: Allocreadiidae
- Genus: Allocreadium; Looss, 1900

Synonyms
- Allocreadioides Yamaguti, 1971; Creadium Looss, 1899; Macrolecithus Hasegawa & Ozaki, 1926; Neoallocreadium Akhmerov, 1960; Rhynchocreadium Srivastava, 1962

Genus of flukes

Allocreadium is a genus of trematodes belonging to the family Allocreadiidae. The genus was first described by Arthur Looss in 1900. The genus has almost cosmopolitan distribution.

== Species ==
Species include the following:

- Allocreadium fasciatusi Kakaji, 1969
- Allocreadium isoporum (Looss, 1894) Looss, 1900
