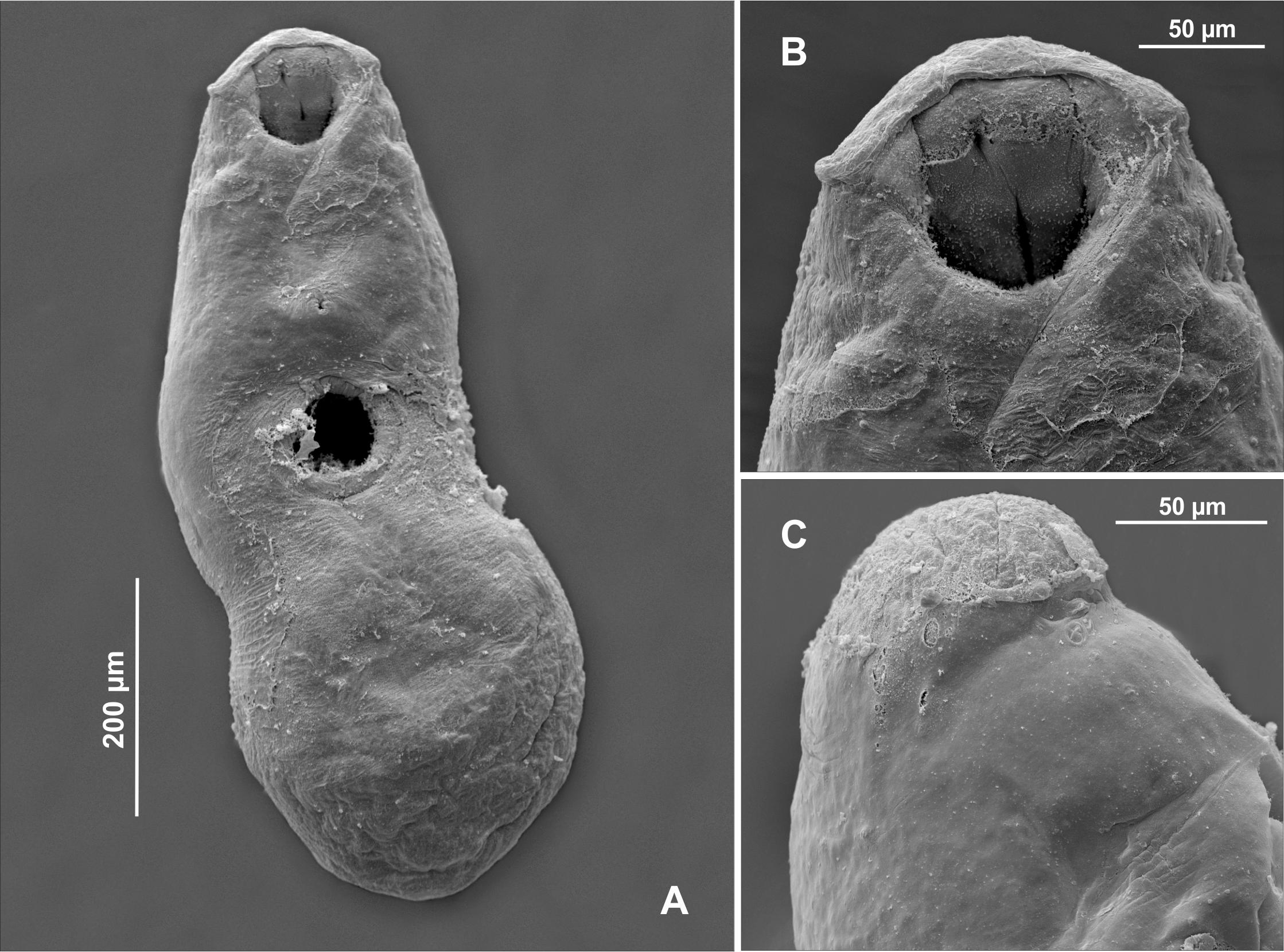
- Creptotrema creptotrema, Transmission electron microscopy

Scientific classification
- Kingdom: Animalia
- Phylum: Platyhelminthes
- Class: Trematoda
- Order: Plagiorchiida
- Family: Allocreadiidae
- Genus: Creptotrema; Travassos, Artigas & Pereira, 1928

= Creptotrema =

Genus of flukes

Creptotrema is a genus of Trematoda belonging to the family Allocreadiidae.

The genus was first described by Travassos, Artigas & Pereira in 1928. Its type-species is Creptotrema creptotrema Travassos, Artigas & Pereira, 1928.

According to a molecular and morphological study by Franceschini et al. (2021), Creptotrema is a monophyletic genus of trematodes widely distributed across the Americas, which currently comprises 19 valid species of parasites of teleost fish and anurans.

== Gallery of images of various Creptotrema species ==
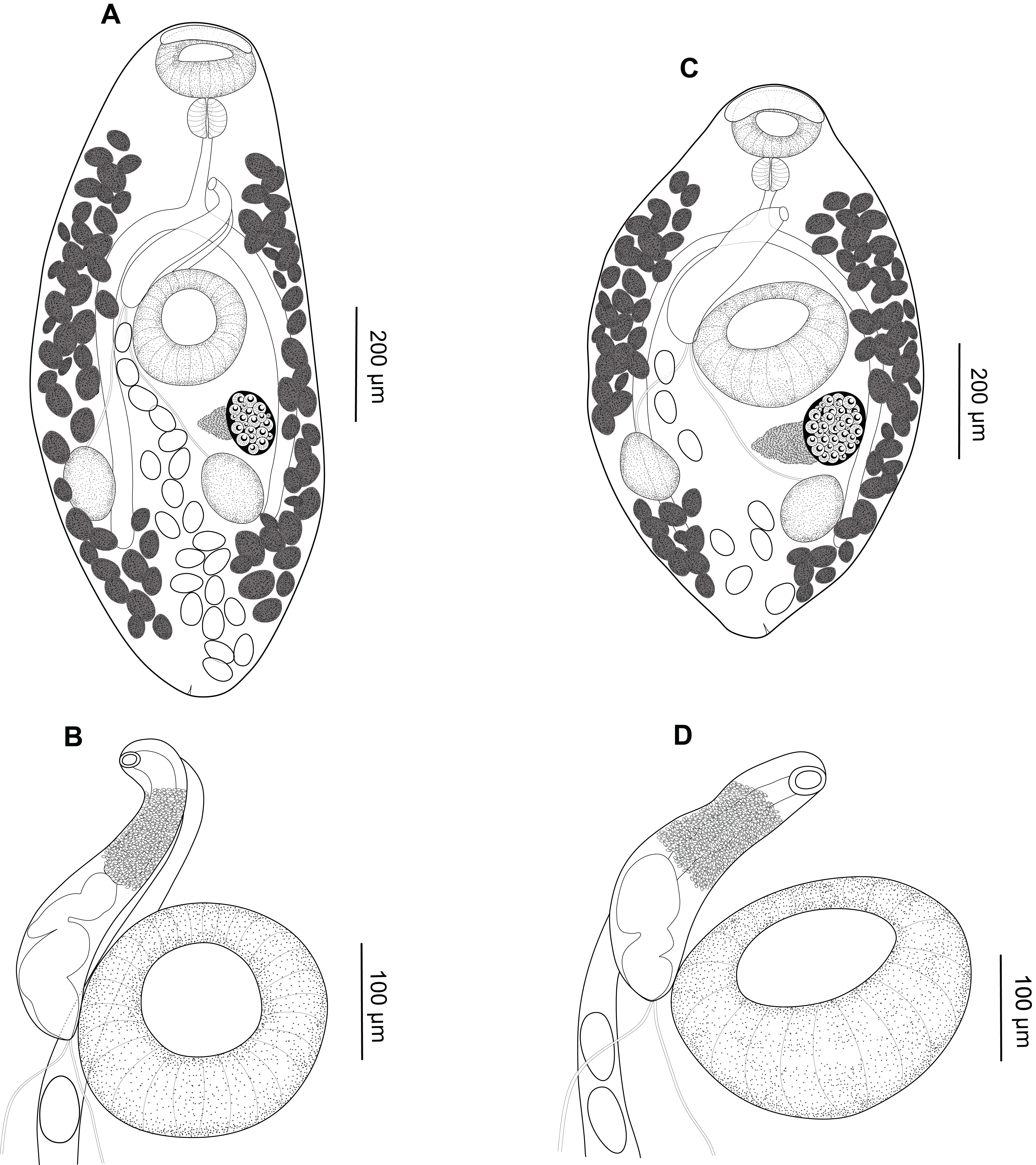
Creptotrema creptotrema, line drawing

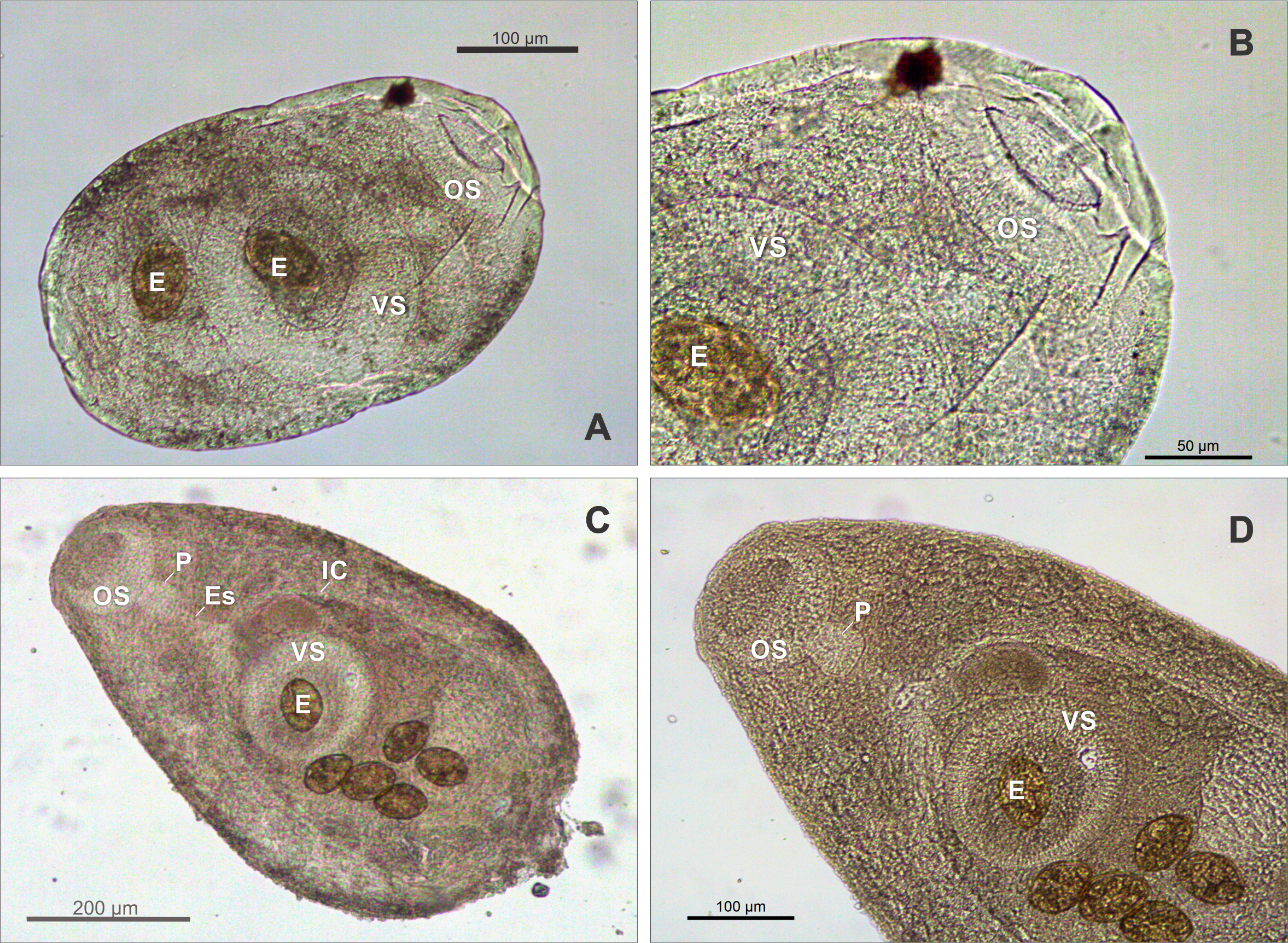
Creptotrema creptotrema, photograph

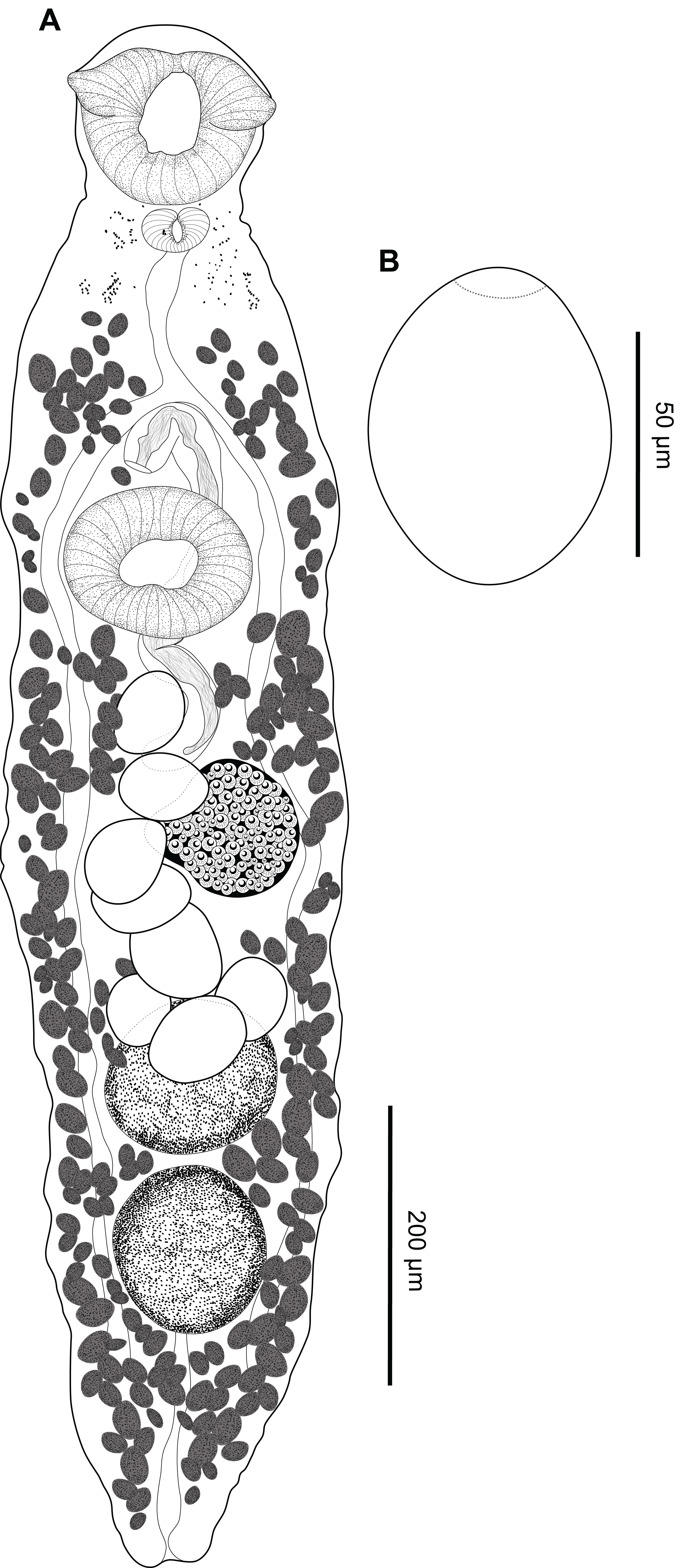
Creptotrema conconae, line drawing

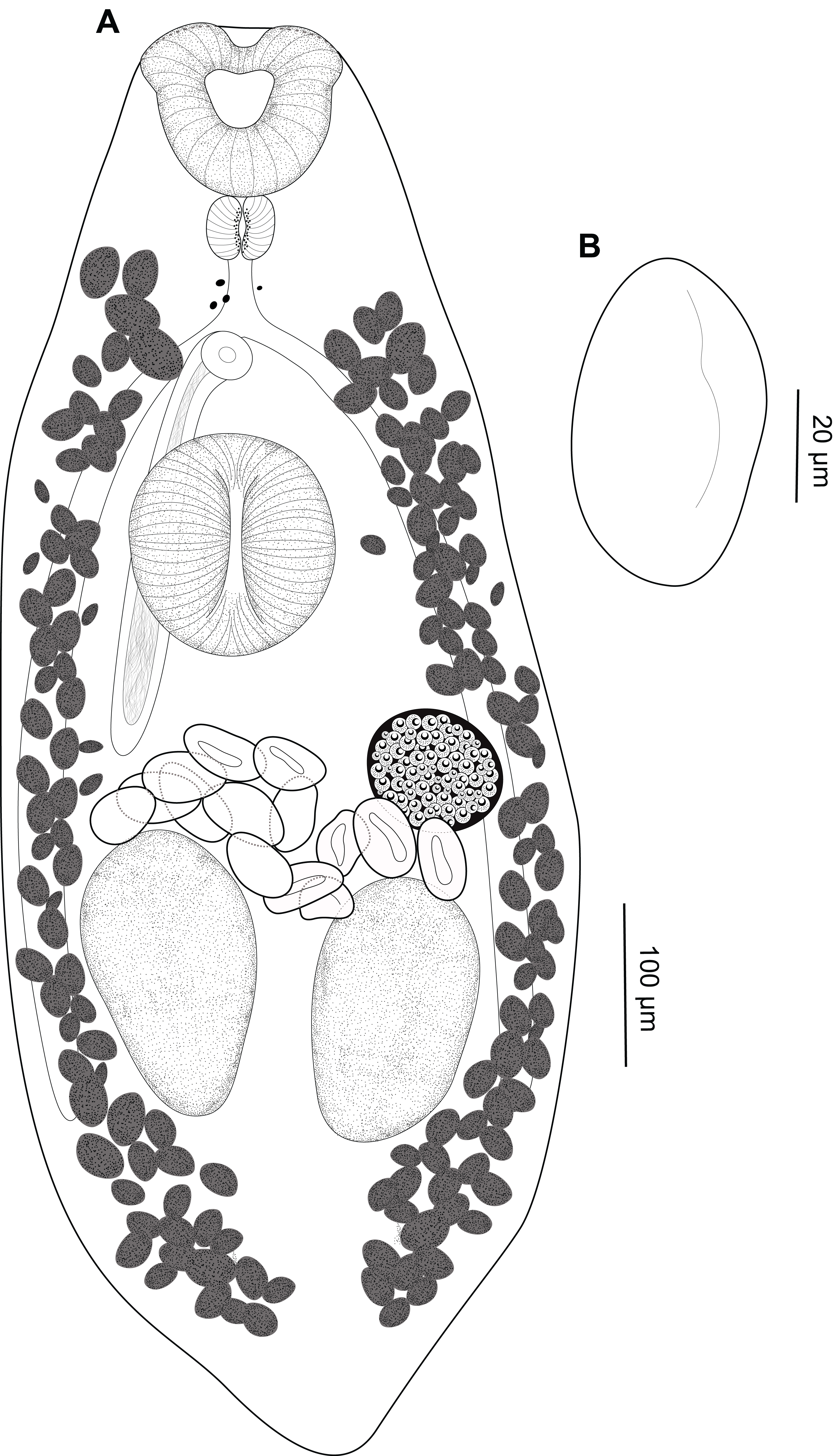
Creptotrema schubarti, line drawing

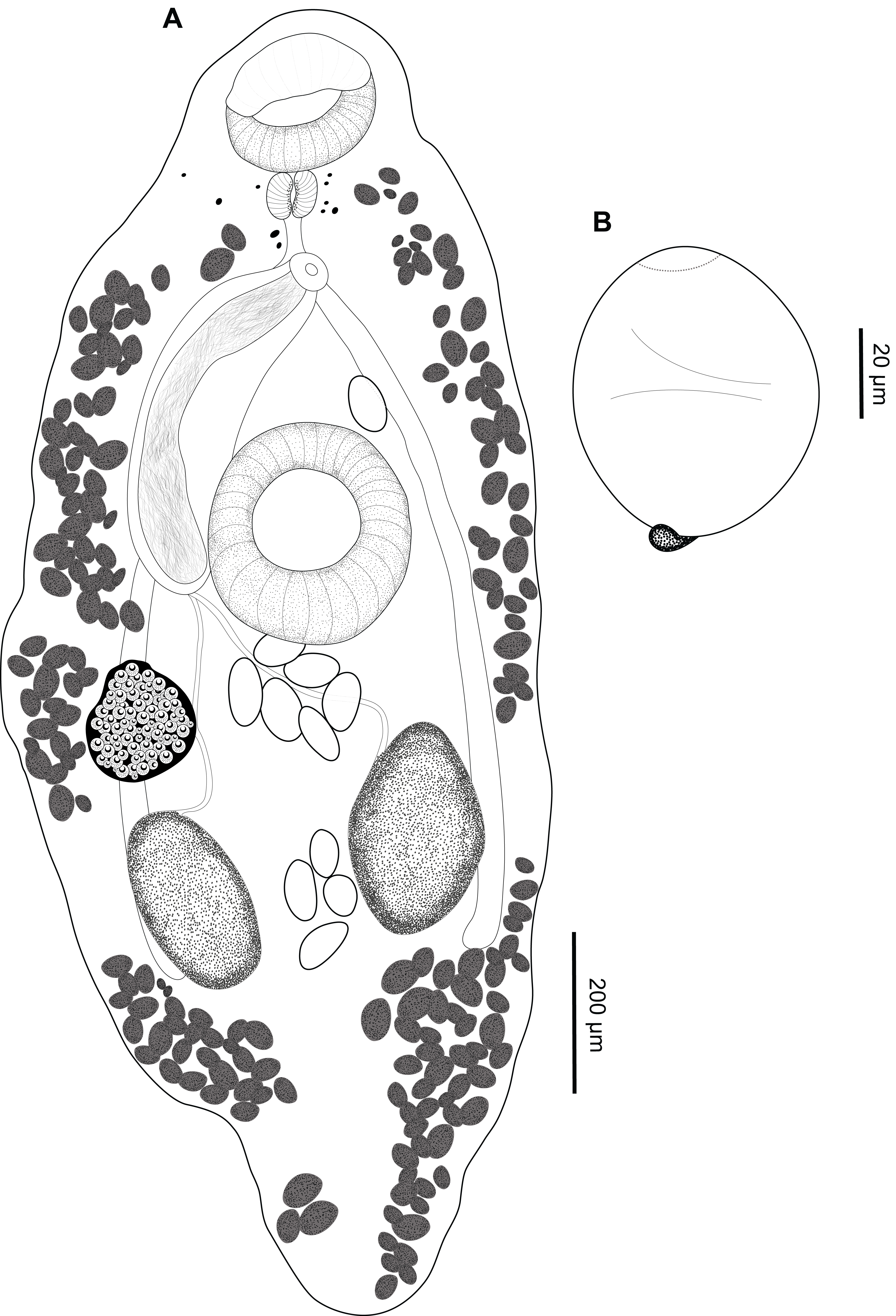
Creptotrema megacetabularis, line drawing
