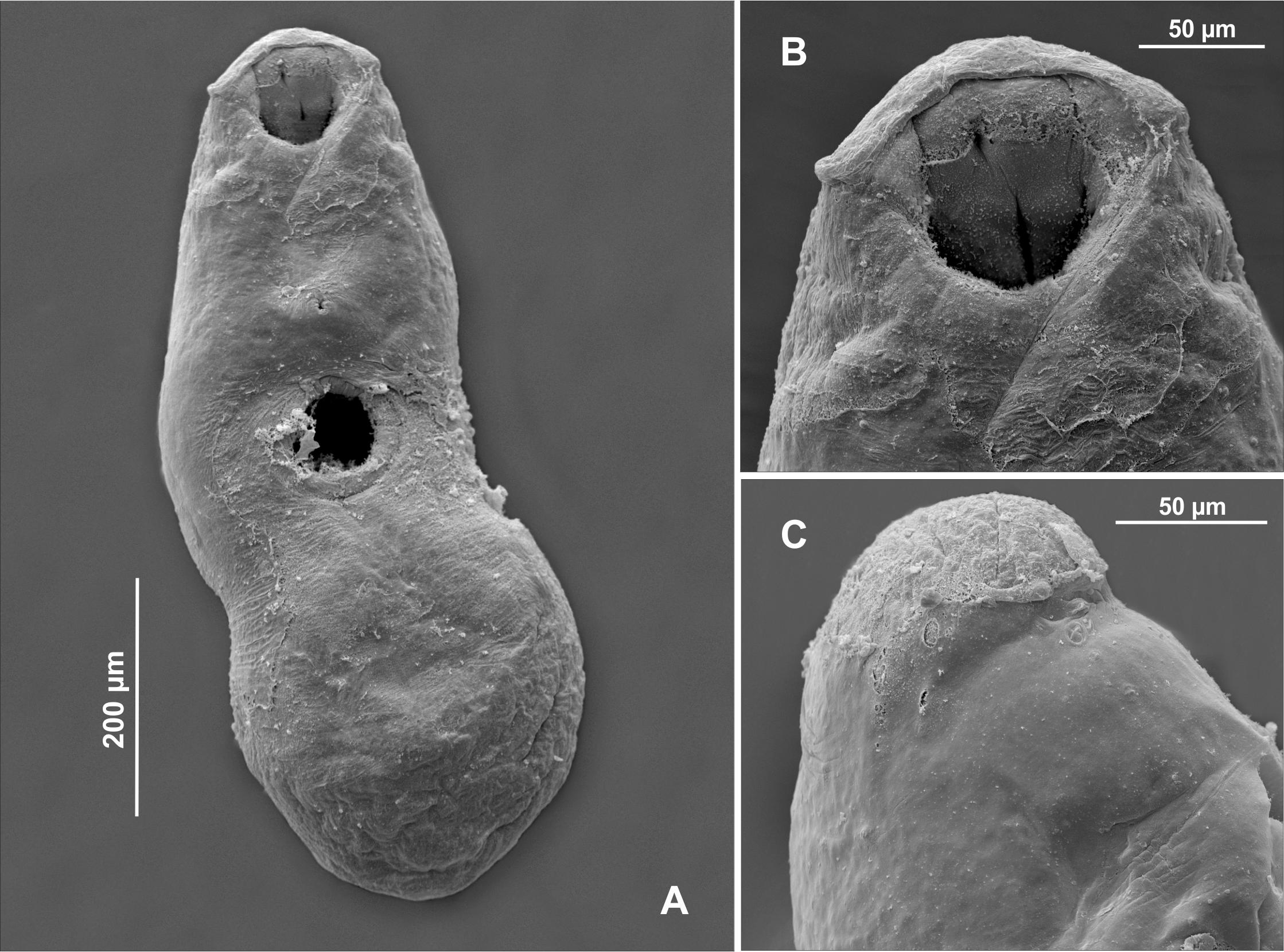
- Creptotrema creptotrema

Scientific classification
- Kingdom: Animalia
- Phylum: Platyhelminthes
- Class: Trematoda
- Order: Plagiorchiida
- Suborder: Xiphidiata
- Superfamily: Gorgoderoidea
- Family: Allocreadiidae; Looss, 1902

= Allocreadiidae =

Family of flatworms

Allocreadiidae is a family of flatworms belonging to the order Plagiorchiida. In their adult stage they parasitize teleosts through their digestive system; they can also parasitize other vertebrates in freshwater ecosystems such as frogs, salamanders, and snakes. Allocreadiidae are distinguished from other Trematoda in the cercarial stage, where the cercaria have both an eye-spot and a stylet. The cercaria of Allocreadiidae also develop in lamellibranchs, whereas many other trematodes develop in gastropods.

== Genera ==
The family includes about 40 genera, including:

- Acanthocreadium Mikailov, 1969
- Acrolichanus Ward, 1917
- Allobunodera Yamaguti, 1971
- Allocreadium Looss, 1900
- Bunodera Railliet, 1896
- Bunoderella Schell, 1964
- Bunoderina Miller, 1936
- Caudoterina Martin, 1966
- Crepidostomum Braun, 1900
- Creptotrema Travassos, Artigas & Pereira, 1928
- Creptotrematina Yamaguti, 1954
- Culeotrema Lasee, Font & Sutherland, 1988
- Paracreptotrematina Amin & Myer, 1982
- Polylekithium Arnold, 1934
- Pseudoallocreadium Yamaguti, 1971
- Margotrema Lamothe-Argumedo, 1970
- Trematichtys Vaz, 1932
