= Hugo Merton =

German zoologist

Hugo Merton (18 November 1879 in Frankfurt am Main – 23 March 1940 in Edinburgh) was a German zoologist.

He studied sciences at the University of Heidelberg. From October 1907 to August 1908, with herpetologist Jean Roux, he conducted scientific investigations in the Aru and Kei Islands. In 1913 he obtained his habilitation at Heidelberg with a dissertation on the flatworm genus Temnocephala. Because of the 1935 Nuremberg Laws imposed by the Nazis, he was forced to relinquish his position as deputy director at the Senckenberg Museum in Frankfurt as well as his professorship at the University of Heidelberg.

In 1937, by way of an invitation from Professor F. A. E. Crew, he went to the University of Edinburgh, where he spent time working in the institute of animal genetics. Upon this return to Germany in 1938, he was arrested and imprisoned in the concentration camp at Dachau. During the following year, he was deported to Scotland, where he resumed his work at the university. Due to deteriorated health, he died soon afterwards in March 1940.

Organisms with the specific epithet of mertoni are named in his honor, an example being the sea snake species Parahydrophis mertoni. In 1911, Max Carl Wilhelm Weber named the fish species Pseudomugil gertrudae after Merton's wife, Gertrude.

== Selected writings ==
- Forschungsreise in den südöstlichen Molukken, 1910 - Expedition to the southeastern Moluccas.
- Ergebnisse einer Zoologischen Forschungsreise in den Südöstlichen Molukken (Aru- und Kei-Inseln), 1910 - Results of a zoological expedition to the southeastern Moluccas (Aru and Kei Islands).
- Die Fische der Aru- und Kei-Inseln: ein Beitrag zur Zoogeographie dieser Inseln, 1911 - Fish of the Aru and Kei Islands.
- Cephalopoden der Aru-und Kei-Inseln, 1913 - Cephalopods of the Aru and Kei Islands.
- Beiträge Zur Anatomie und Histology von Temnocephala, (Habilitationsschrift) 1913 - Contribution to the anatomy and histology of Temnocephala.
- "Studies on Reproduction in the Albino Mouse", Royal Society of Edinburgh, 1939.
