= Bunodera =

Scientific classification
- Kingdom: Animalia
- Phylum: Platyhelminthes
- Class: Trematoda
- Order: Plagiorchiida
- Family: Allocreadiidae
- Genus: Bunodera; Railliet, 1896

Genus of worms

Bunodera is a genus of flatworms belonging to the family Allocreadiidae.

The species of this genus are found in Europe and Northern America.

Species:

- Bunodera acerinae Roitman & Sokolov, 1999
- Bunodera eucaliae (Miller, 1936) Miller, 1940
