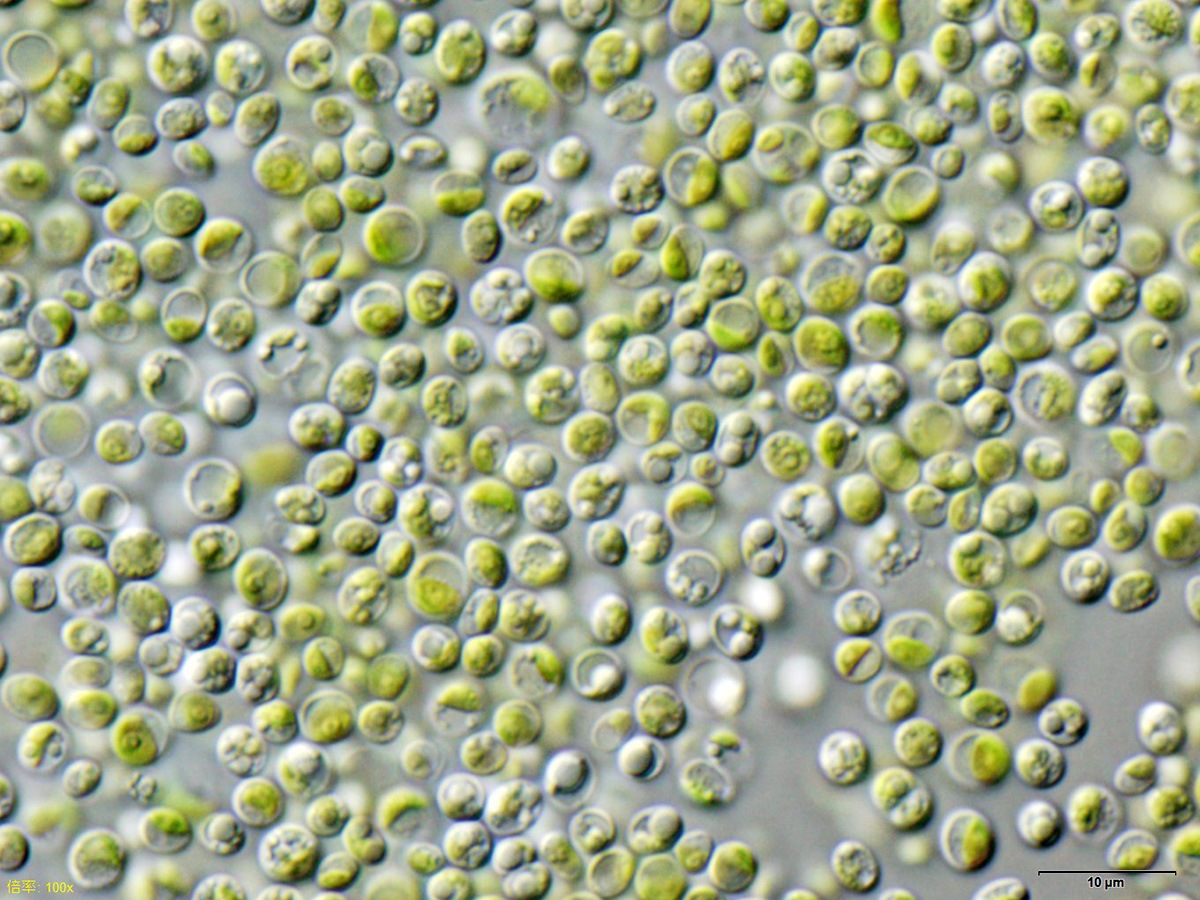
- Chlorella vulgaris on microscope view

Scientific classification
- Domain: Eukaryota
- Clade: Archaeplastida
- Clade: Viridiplantae
- Division: Chlorophyta
- Class: Trebouxiophyceae
- Order: Chlorellales
- Family: Chlorellaceae
- Genus: Chlorella
- Species: C. vulgaris

Binomial name
- Chlorella vulgaris Beijerinck 1890

Varieties
- Chlorella vulgaris var. vulgaris; Chlorella vulgaris var. autotrophica (Shihira & Krauss) Fott & Nováková

Synonyms
- Chlorella vulgaris var. viridis Chodat; Chlorella ellipsoidea Gerneck

= Chlorella vulgaris =

Species of green alga

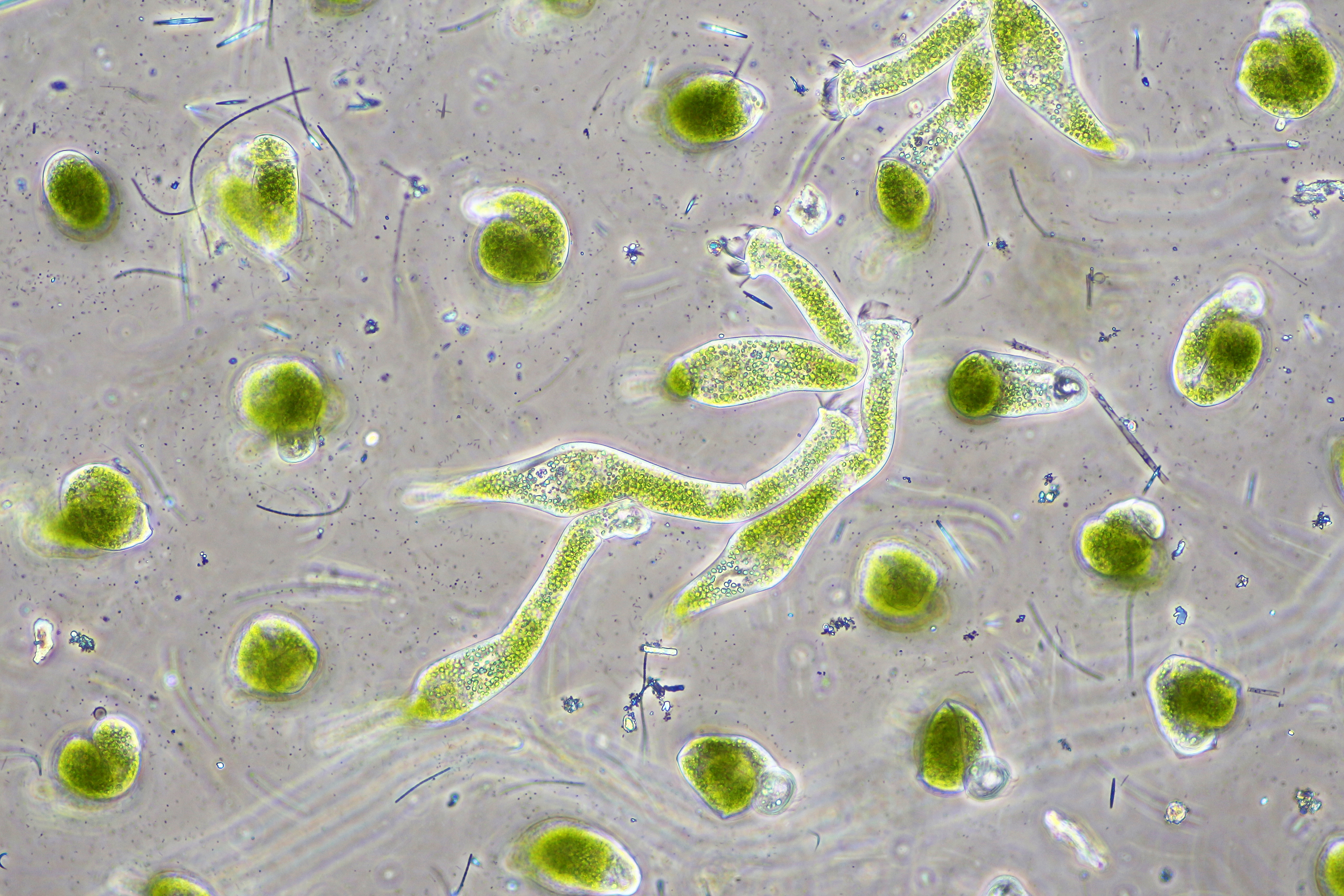
Chlorella vulgaris in endosymbiosis with the ciliate Ophrydium versatile

Chlorella vulgaris is a species of green microalga in the division Chlorophyta. This unicellular alga was discovered in 1890 by Martinus Willem Beijerinck as the first microalga with a well-defined nucleus. It is the type species of the genus Chlorella. It is found in freshwater and terrestrial habitats, and has a cosmopolitan distribution.

Chlorella vulgaris has a number of potential applications in science, such as biofuel, livestock feed, and wastewater treatment. Beginning in the 1990s, German scientists noticed the high protein content of C. vulgaris and began to consider it as a new food source. Japan is currently the largest consumer of Chlorella, both for nutritional and therapeutic purposes, and it is used as a dietary supplement or protein-rich food additive in several countries worldwide.

== Description ==
C. vulgaris is a green eukaryotic microalga. The cells are 4–10 μm in diameter, and are spherical. The chloroplast (chromatophore) is pea-green in color and cup-shaped, with a single pyrenoid.

== Symbiosis ==
Chlorella vulgaris occurs as a symbiont in tissues of the freshwater flatworms Dalyellia viridis and Typhloplana viridata.

== Production ==
The world annual production of the various species of Chlorella was 2000 tonnes (dry weight) in 2009, with the main producers being Germany, Japan and Taiwan. C. vulgaris is a candidate for commercial production due to its high resistance against adverse conditions and invading organisms. In addition, the production of the various organic macromolecules of interest (proteins, lipids, starch) differ depending on the technique used to create biomass and can be therefore targeted. Under more hostile conditions, the biomass decreases, but lipids and starch contents increase. Under nutrient and light-replete conditions, protein content increases along with the biomass. Different growth techniques have been developed. Different modes of growth (autotrophic, heterotrophic, and mixotrophic) has been investigated for Chlorella vulgaris; autotrophic growth is favoured as it does not require provision of costly organic carbon and relies on inorganic carbon sources (CO_{2}, carbonates) and light for photosynthesis.

Chlorella sp. cultivated in digested and membrane-pretreated swine manure is capable of improving the growth medium performance of microalgae cultivations in terms of final biomass productivity, showing that algal growth depends on the turbidity of liquid digestate streams rather than on their nutrient availability.

== Uses ==
=== Bioremediation ===
Chlorella vulgaris has been the microalgae of choice for several bioremediation processes. Owing to its ability to remove a variety of pollutants such as inorganic nutrients (nitrate, nitrite, phosphate and ammonium), fertilizers, detergents, heavy metals, pesticides, pharmaceuticals and other emerging pollutants from wastewater and effluents, carbon dioxide and other gaseous pollutants from flue gases, besides having high growth rates and simple cultivation requirements, Chlorella vulgaris has emerged as a potential microorganism in bioremediation studies for mitigation of environmental pollution.

=== Bioenergy ===
C. vulgaris is seen as a promising source of bioenergy. It may be a good alternative to biofuel crops, like soybean, corn or rapeseed, as it is more productive and does not compete with food production. It can produce large amount of lipids, up to 20 times more than crops that have a suitable profile for biodiesel production. This microalgae also contains high amounts of starch, good for the production of bioethanol. However, microalgal biofuels are far from competitive with fossil fuels, given their high production costs and controversial sustainability.

=== Food ingredient and dietary supplement ===
The protein content of C. vulgaris varies from 42 to 58% of its biomass dry weight. These proteins are considered as having a good nutritional quality compared to the standard profile for human nutrition of the World Health Organization and Food and Agriculture Organization, as the algae synthesizes amino acids. The algae also contains lipids (5–40% of the dry mass), carbohydrates (12–55% dry weight), and pigments including chlorophyll, reaching 1–2 % of the dry weight.

Containing dietary minerals and vitamins, C. vulgaris is marketed as a dietary supplement, food additive, or food colorant. Extracted proteins have been investigated for manufacturing of emulsion and foams. It is not widely incorporated in food products due to its dark green color and smell similar to that of fish. As a dietary supplement, it may be sold as capsules, extracts, tablets or powder. Vitamin B_{12}, specifically in the form of methylcobalamin, has been identified in Chlorella vulgaris.
