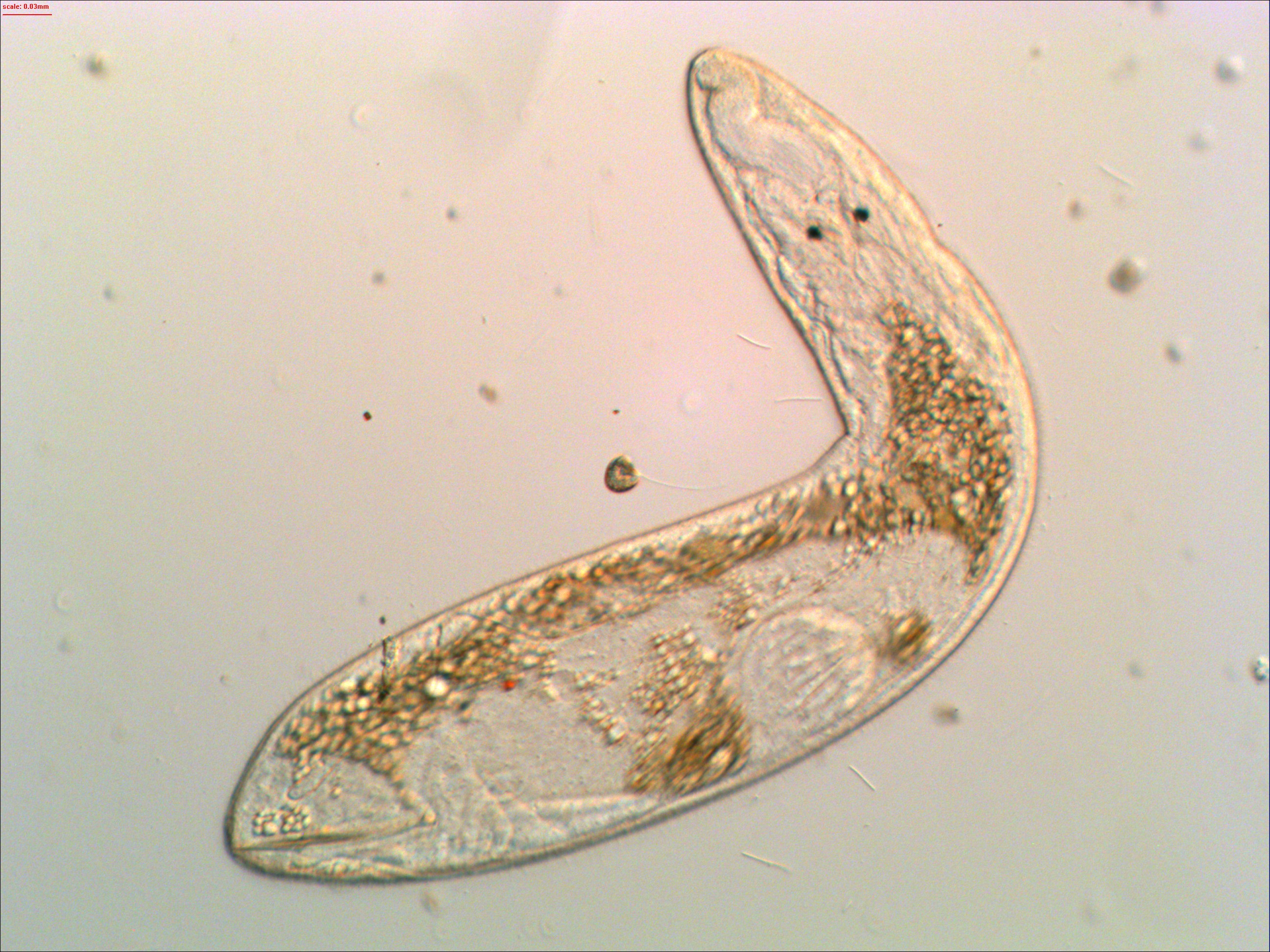
- Gyratrix hermaphroditus.

Scientific classification
- Kingdom: Animalia
- Phylum: Platyhelminthes
- Order: Rhabdocoela
- Suborder: Kalyptorhynchia; Graff, 1905

Subgroups
- Toia; Eukalyptorhynchia; Cicerinidae; Schizorhynchia

= Kalyptorhynchia =

Suborder of rhabdocoel flatworms

Kalyptorhynchia is a suborder of rhabdocoel flatworms. It contains almost 600 species and has a cosmopolitan distribution.

== Description ==
All kalyptorhynchs have an anterior muscular proboscis, which is used to capture prey. The proboscis is located inside an invagination of the epidermis called the proboscis-sheath that is closed by a sphincter at the tip of the body. Another synapomorphy supporting the group is the incorporation of the axonemes within the cell body of sperm cells during spermiogenesis.

== Classification ==
Kalyptorhynchs are traditionally classified into two infraorders: Eukalyptorhynchia, with a cone-shaped proboscis, and Schizorhynchia, with a proboscis formed by two opposite parallel muscular sheets. However, molecular studies have shown that Eukalyptorhynchia, as originally defined, is paraphyletic and includes Schizorhynchia. It becomes monophyletic if the family Cicerinidae is excluded.

Current phylogenetic classification:

- Kalyptorhynchia
  - Toia
  - - Eukalyptorhynchia sensu stricto
    - - Cicerinidae
      - Schizorhynchia
