= Dalyellia =

Scientific classification
- Kingdom: Animalia
- Phylum: Platyhelminthes
- Order: Rhabdocoela
- Family: Dalyelliidae
- Genus: Dalyellia; Gieysztor, 1938

Genus of worms

Dalyellia is a genus of rhabdocoel flatworms belonging to the family Dalyelliidae.

The species of this genus are found in Europe, Southern Africa and Northern America.

Species:

- Dalyellia alba Higley, 1918
- Dalyellia callvucurai Damborenea, Brusa & Noreña, 2007
- Dalyellia viridis (Shaw, 1791)
