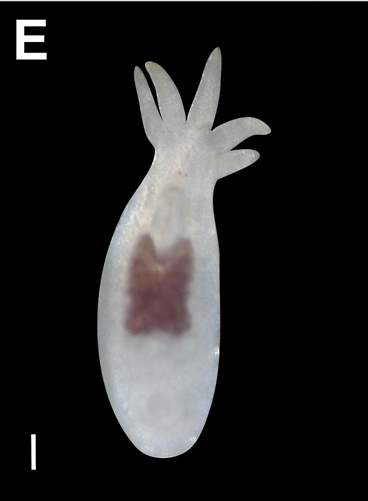
- Live adult specimen of Temnocephala ivandarioi

Scientific classification
- Kingdom: Animalia
- Phylum: Platyhelminthes
- Order: Rhabdocoela
- Family: Temnocephalidae
- Genus: Temnocephala; Blanchard, 1849

Type species
- Temnocephala chilensis (Moquin-Tandon, 1846) Blanchard, 1849

Species
- See Taxonomy

= Temnocephala =

Genus of flatworms

Temnocephala is a genus of flatworms in the family Temnocephalidae. They inhabit freshwater environments in the Neotropics and the various species attributed to the genus have established symbiotic relationships with a large variety of hosts including crustaceans (21), insects (7), mollusks (6), and turtles (3).

== Taxonomy ==
The following species are recognised in the genus Temnocephala:

- T. axenos Monticelli, 1899
- T. brenesi Jennings, 1968
- T. bresslaui Gonzalez, 1949
- T. brevicornis Haswell, 1892
- T. chilensis (Moquin-Tandon, 1846) Blanchard, 1849
- T. colombiensis Garcés, Puerta, Tabares, Lenis & Velásquez, 2013
- T. costaricensis Lamothe Argumedo, 1974
- T. costarricensis Lamothe, 1974
- T. cuocoloi Volonterio, 2010
- T. curvicirri Amato & Amato, 2005
- T. cyanoglandula Amato, Amato & Daudt, 2003
- T. decarloi Moretto, 1978
- T. digitata Monticelli, 1903
- T. dionii Ponce de Leon, Beron Vera & Volonterio, 2015
- T. fulva Hickman, 1967
- T. gargantua Ponce de Leon & Volonterio, 2018
- T. haswelli Ponce de Leon, 1989
- T. iheringi Haswell, 1893
- T. ivandarioi Lenis, Ruiz, Muskus, Marcilla & Vélez, 2020
- T. kingsleyae Damborenea, 1994
- T. lamothei Damborenea & Brusa, 2008
- T. lanei Pereira & Cuoccolo, 1941
- T. longivaginata Seixas, Amato & Amato, 2011
- T. lutzi Monticelli, 1913
- T. mertoni Volonterio, 2007
- T. mexicana Vayssiere, 1898
- T. microdactyla Monticelli, 1903
- T. minutocirrus Amato, Seixas & Amato, 2007
- T. monticellii Ponce de León, Rudolph & Volonterio, 2020
- T. pereirai Volonterio, 2010
- T. peruensis Ibáñez & Jara, 2002
- T. pignalberiae Dioni, 1967
- T. pygmaea Hickman, 1967
- T. rochensis Ponce de Leon, 1979
- T. santafesina Dioni, 1967
- T. sugarei Haswell, 1893
- T. talicei Dioni, 1967
- T. trapeziformis Amato, Amato & Seixas, 2006
- T. travassosfillioi Pereira & Cuoccolo, 1941
