= Provorticidae =

Scientific classification
- Kingdom: Animalia
- Phylum: Platyhelminthes
- Order: Rhabdocoela
- Infraorder: Neodalyellida
- Family: Provorticidae

Family of flatworms

Provorticidae is a family of flatworms belonging to the order Rhabdocoela.

== Genera ==
Genera:

- Annulovortex Beklemischev, 1953
- Archivortex Reisinger, 1924
- Baicalellia Nasonov, 1930
