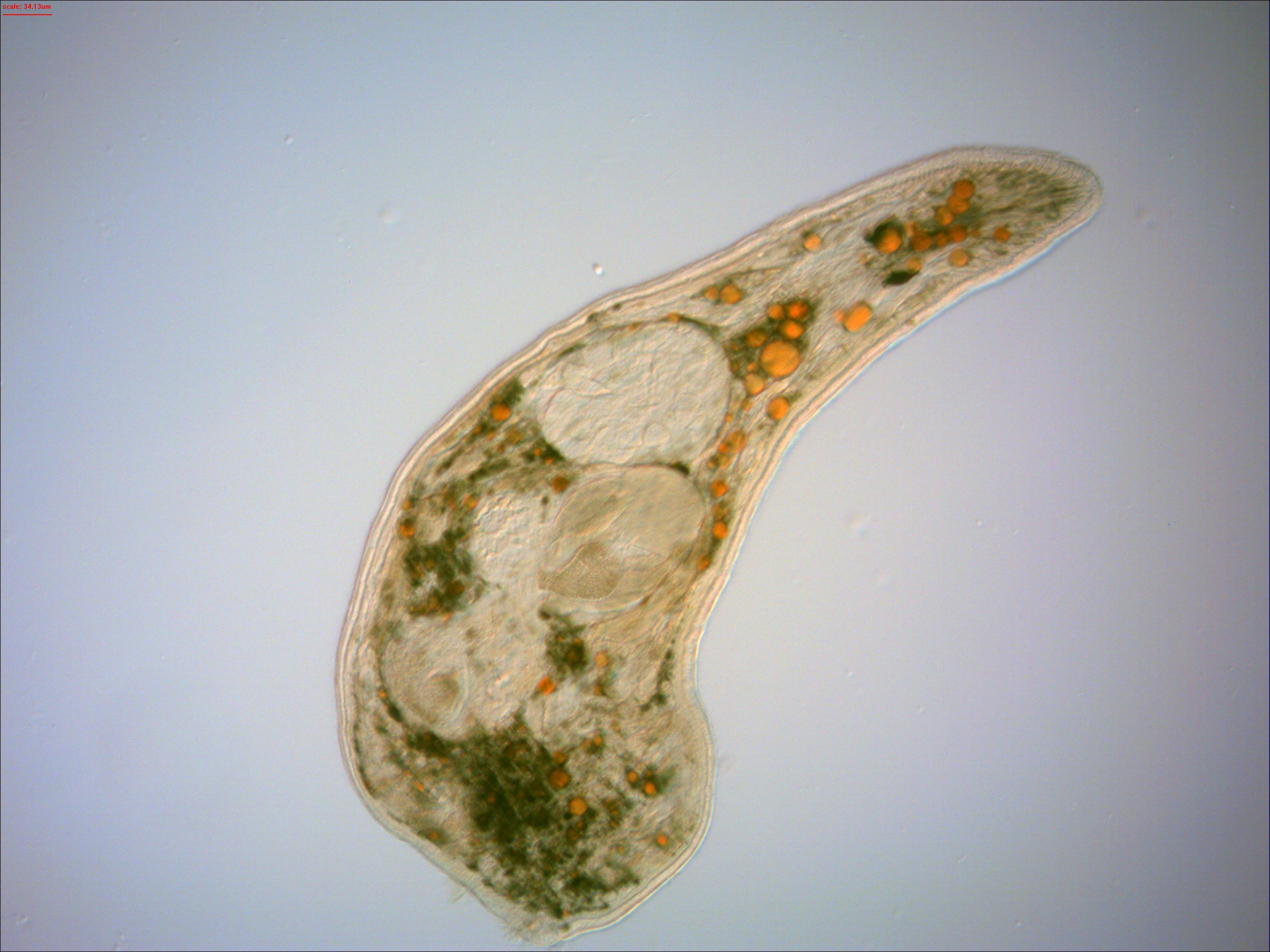
- Strongylostoma elongatum spinosum.

Scientific classification
- Kingdom: Animalia
- Phylum: Platyhelminthes
- Order: Rhabdocoela
- Suborder: Dalytyphloplanida; Willems, Wallberg, Jondelius, Littlewood, Backeljau, Schockaert & Artois, 2006

Subdivisions
- Infraorder Neodalyellida; Infraorder Neotyphloplanida; Family Hypoblepharinidae; Family Luridae; Genus †Micropalaeosoma

= Dalytyphloplanida =

Suborder of flatworms

Dalytyphloplanida is a suborder of rhabdocoel flatworms. It contains about 1000 species and has a cosmopolitan distribution in both marine and freshwater environments, with several groups having commensal or parasitic lifestyles.

== Description ==
The suborder Dalytyphloplanida was recently erected based on molecular evidences and few synapomorphies are known. The possible identified synapomorphies include the presence of small dense granules, as well as an axonemal spur and a group of longitudinal microtubules in sperm cells.

== Classification ==
Traditionally, members of the suborder Dalytyphloplanida were classified into two groups: Dalyellioida and Typhloplanoida, although both were poorly characterized morphologically. Recent molecular studies revealed that those two groups were not separated clades and both were merged in the clade Dalytyphloplanida.

Within Dalytyphloplanida two clades were found: Neodalyellida, formed by marine species of the former group Dalyellioida, some of which are parasites, and Neotyphloplanida, which includes a clade of marine species of the former Typhloplanoida (Thalassotyphloplanida) and one of freshwater species (Limnotyphloplanida). However, synapomorphies for these newly erected clades are not yet known.
