= Trigonostomidae =

Scientific classification
- Kingdom: Animalia
- Phylum: Platyhelminthes
- Order: Rhabdocoela
- Family: Trigonostomidae

Family of worms

Trigonostomidae is a family of flatworms belonging to the order Rhabdocoela.

== Genera ==
Genera:

- Archixenetes Ax, 1971
- Astrotorhynchus Graff, 1905
- Beklemischeviella Luther, 1943
