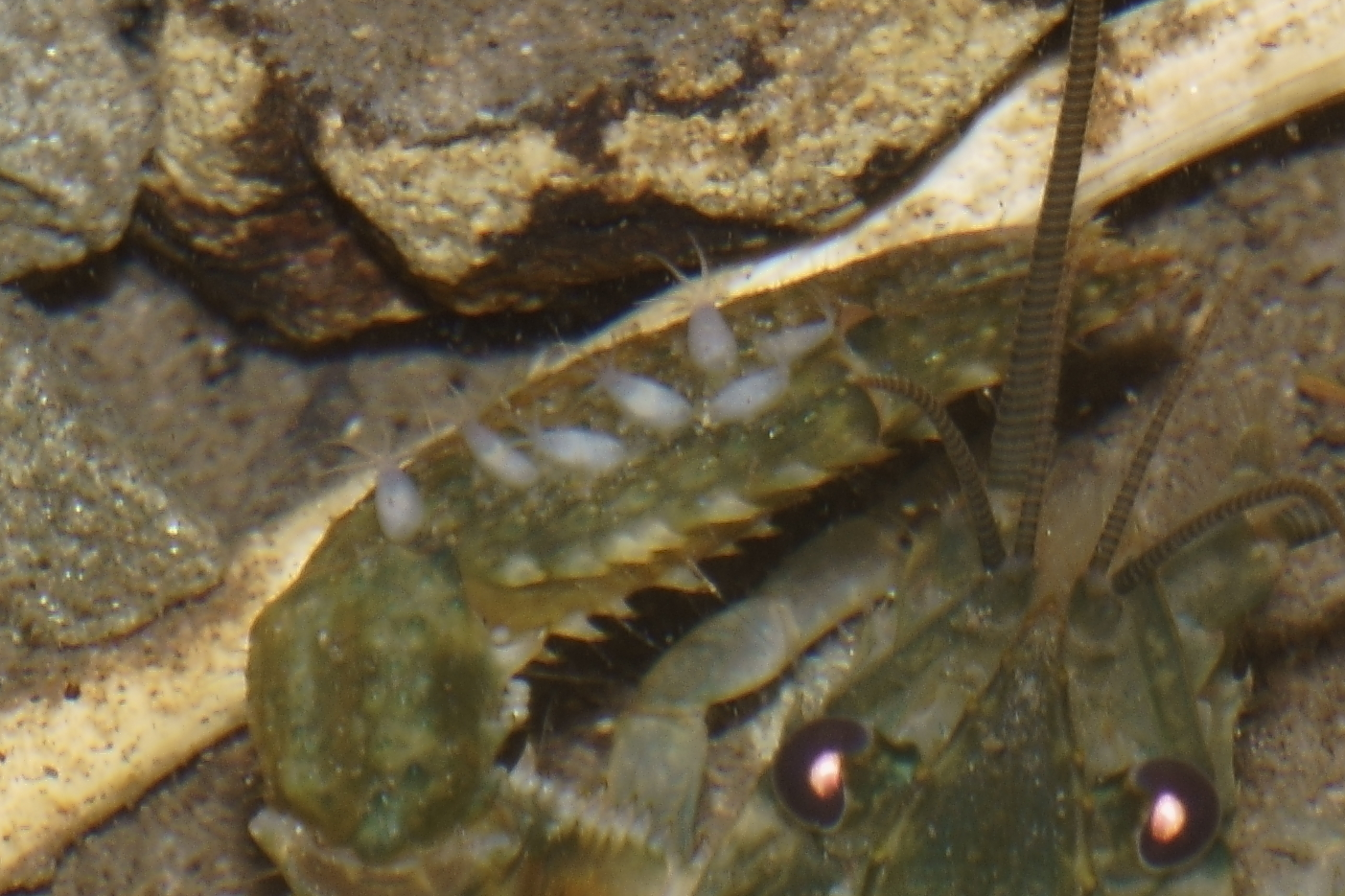
- Temnohaswellia novaezealandiae

Scientific classification
- Kingdom: Animalia
- Phylum: Platyhelminthes
- Order: Rhabdocoela
- Parvorder: Limnotyphloplanida
- Family: Temnocephalidae; Van Steenkiste, Rivlin, Kahn, Wakeman & Leander, 2021

= Temnocephalidae =

Family of flatworms

Temnocephalidae is a family of flatworms belonging to the order Rhabdocoela, and was first described in 1899 by Monticelli.

== Genera ==
Genera & subfamilies accepted by WoRMS:

- Subfamily Actinodactylellinae Benham, 1901
  - Genus Actinodactylella Haswell, 1893
- Subfamily Decadidyminae Van Steenkiste, Rivlin, Kahn, Wakeman & Leander, 2021
  - Genus Decadidymus Cannon, 1991
- Subfamily Diceratocephalinae Joffe, Cannon & Schockaert, 1998
  - Genus Diceratocephala Baer, 1953
- Subfamily Didymorchinae Bresslau & Reisinger, 1933
  - Genus Didymorchis Haswell, 1900
- Subfamily Scutariellinae Annandale, 1912
  - Genus Bubalocerus Matjašič, 1958
  - Genus Caridinicola Annandale, 1912
  - Genus Monodiscus Plate, 1914
  - Genus Paracaridinicola Baer, 1953
  - Genus Scutariella Mrazek, 1907
  - Genus Stygodyticola Matjašič, 1958
  - Genus Subtelsonia Matjašič, 1958
  - Genus Troglocaridicola Matjašič, 1958
- Subfamily Temnocephalinae Monticelli, 1899
  - Genus Achenella Cannon, 1993
  - Genus Craniocephala Monticelli, 1905
  - Genus Craspedella Haswell, 1893
  - Genus Dactylocephala Monticelli, 1899
  - Genus Gelasinella Sewell & Cannon, 1998
  - Genus Heptacraspedella Cannon & Sewell, 1995
  - Genus Notodactylus Baer, 1953
  - Genus Temnocephala Blanchard, 1849
  - Genus Temnohaswellia Pereira & Cuoccolo, 1941
  - Genus Temnomonticellia Pereira & Cuoccolo, 1941
  - Genus Temnosewellia Damborenea & Cannon, 2001
  - Genus Zygopella Cannon & Sewell, 1995
