= Cicerinidae =

Scientific classification
- Kingdom: Animalia
- Phylum: Platyhelminthes
- Order: Rhabdocoela
- Family: Cicerinidae

Family of flatworms

Cicerinidae is a family of flatworms belonging to the order Rhabdocoela.

== Genera ==
Genera:

- Acirrostylus Van Steenkiste, Volonterio, Schockaert & Artois, 2008
- Acrumena Brunet, 1965
- Cicerina Giard, 1904
