= Stylet (zoology) =

Hard, sharp, anatomical structure found in some invertebrates

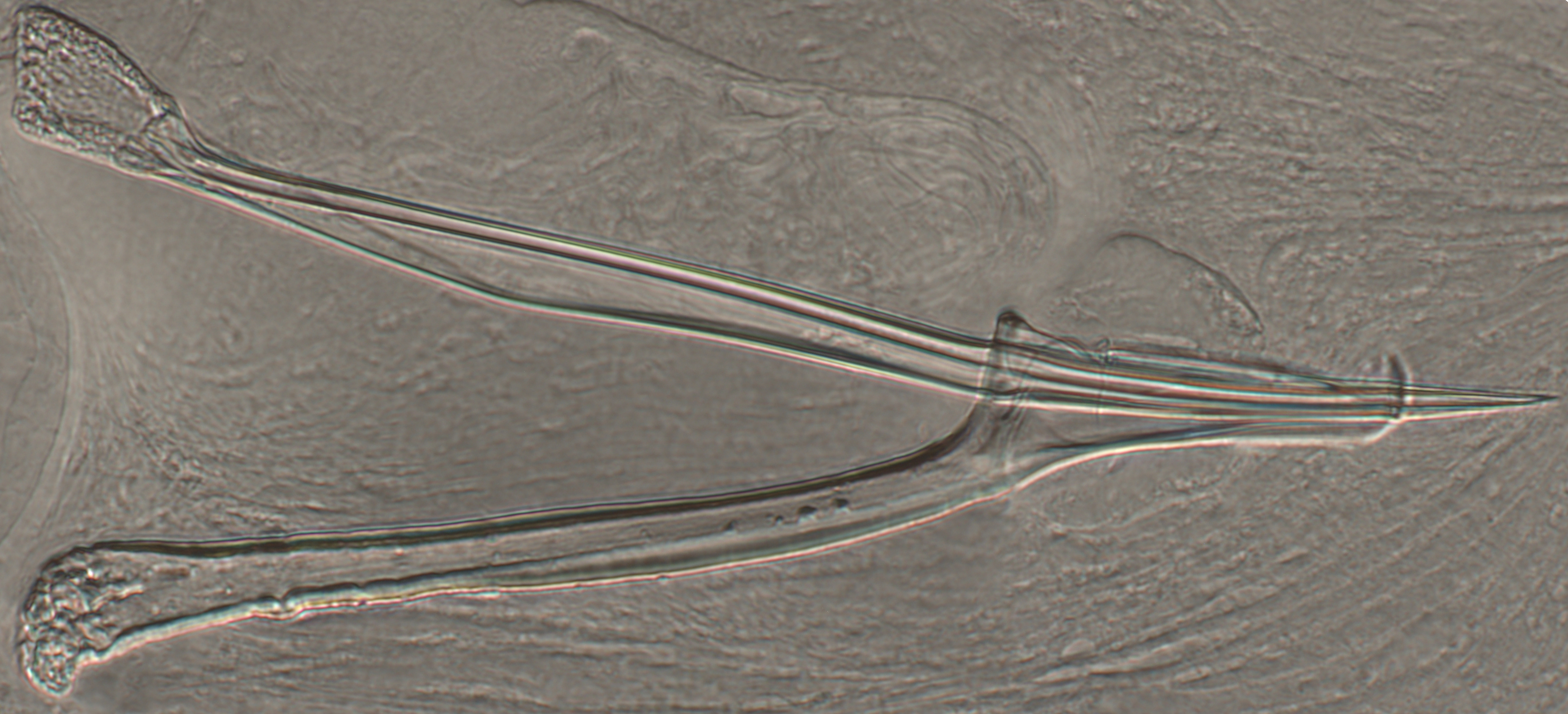
Stylet of a kalyptorhynch flatworm

A stylet is a hard, sharp, anatomical structure found in some invertebrates. For example, the word stylet or stomatostyle is used for the primitive piercing mouthparts of some nematodes and some nemerteans. In these groups the stylet is a hardened protrusible opening to the stomach. These stylets are adapted for the piercing of cell walls and usually function by providing the operative organism with access to the nutrients contained within the prey cell.

The mouthparts of tardigrades, diptera and aphids are also called stylets.

In octopodes, the stylets are internal, needle-like bent rods within the mantle, the vestigial remnants of an external shell.
