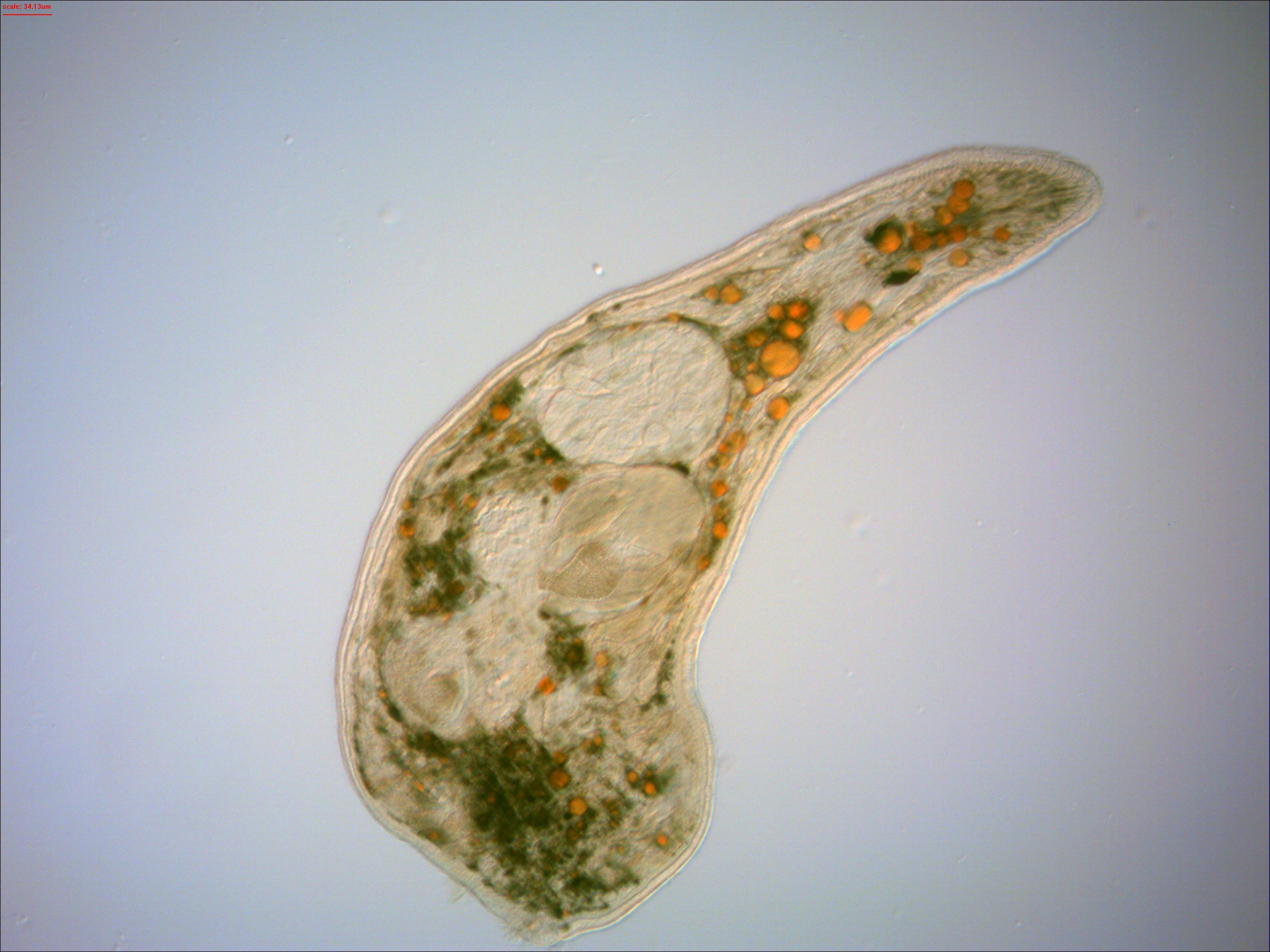
- Strongylostoma elongatum spinosum.

Scientific classification
- Kingdom: Animalia
- Phylum: Platyhelminthes
- Subphylum: Rhabditophora
- Order: Rhabdocoela; Ehrenberg, 1831

Suborders
- Kalyptorhynchia; Dalytyphloplanida; Mariplanellida

= Rhabdocoela =

Order of flatworms

Rhabdocoela is an order of flatworms in the class Rhabditophora with about 1700 species described worldwide. The order was first described in 1831 by Christian Gottfried Ehrenberg. Most of rhabdocoels are free-living organisms, but some live symbiotically with other animals.

== Description ==
Although Rhabdocoela is a highly supported group in molecular studies, there is no clear morphological synapomorphy that unites them. All rhabdocoels have a bulbous pharynx, but this is shared with other flatworm groups, such as Neodermata, Lecithoepitheliata and some species of Prolecithophora.

Some possibly identified synapomorphies are found in the ultrastructure of the protonephridial system, but similar constructions exist in other groups. Another possible apomorphy is found in the ultrastructure of the sperm, which has a dense heel on the basal bodies during spermiogenesis, but some groups have lost this feature.

== Classification ==
Rhabdocoels were traditionally classified in two groups, Dalyellioida and Typhloplanoida, although this system was suspected to be artificial. Later, molecular studies have shown that these groups were not monophyletic. One subgroup of Dalyellioida, Fecampiida, does not group within Rhabdocoela, but is closely related to Tricladida and Prolecithophora. The group Kalyptorhynchia, previously a subgroup of Thyphloplanoida, appears to be the sister-group of most other rhabdocoels, which form a clade named Dalytyphloplanida. Recently, a third group, Mariplanellida, was erected based on molecular phylogeny.

== Ecology ==
Most rhabdocoels are freshwater organisms. Some groups, such as typhloplanids, are predators, the main prey being cladocerans. Others feed on algae and may incorporate them in their tissues.

The temnocephalidans all live as ectosymbionts or parasites of other freshwater animals, such as arthropods, mollusks, and turtles.
