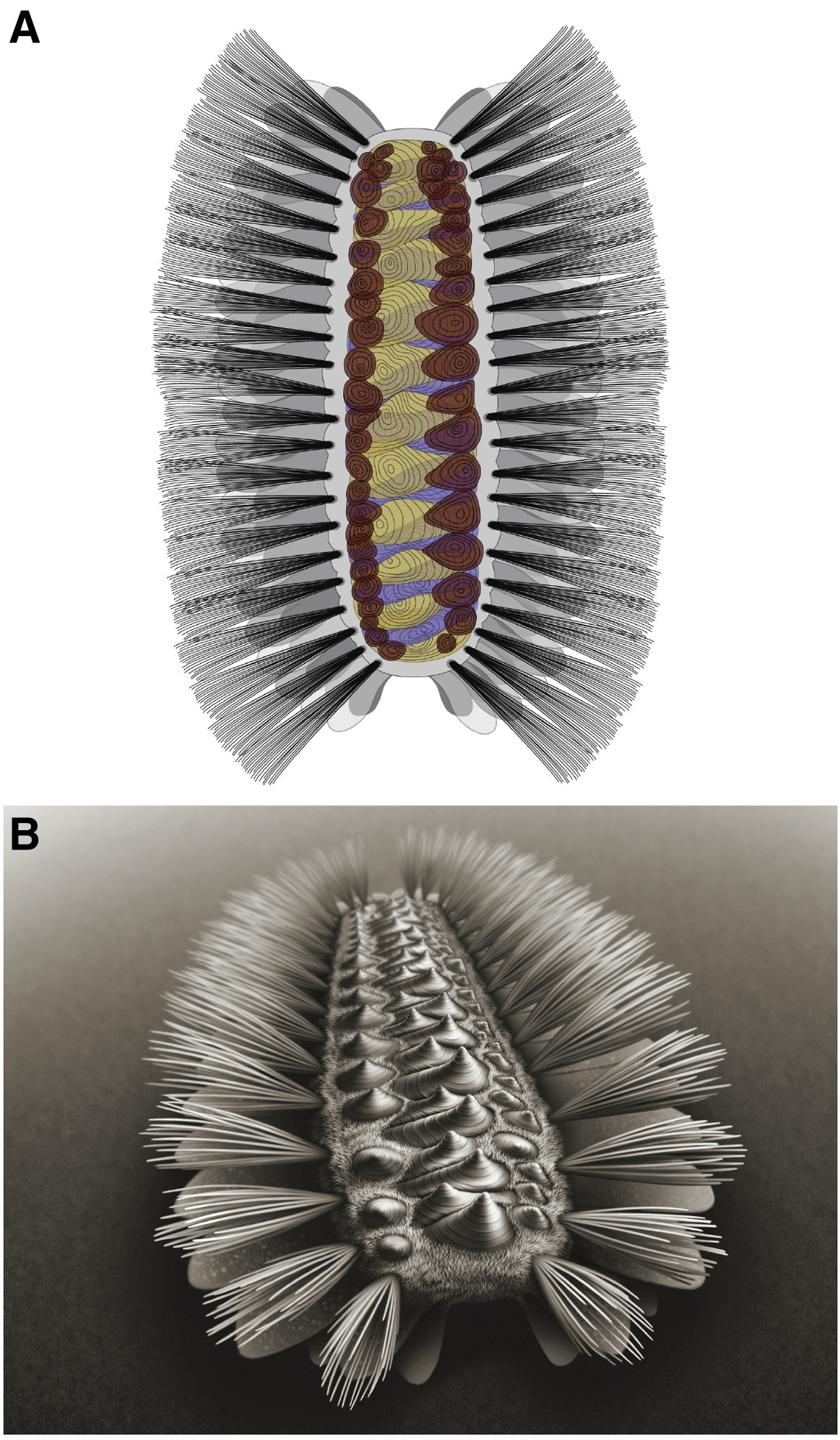
- Interpretive drawing (top) and life restoration (bottom) of Wufengella a camenellan, and one of the few tommotiids known from articulated remains
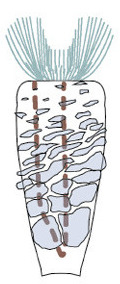
- Life restoration of Eccentrotheca, a sessile tommotiid

Scientific classification
- Kingdom: Animalia
- Superphylum: Lophotrochozoa
- Order: Tommotiida

= Tommotiid =

Tommotiids Temporal range: Terreneuvian–Drumian (Tommotiida survives until present day through extant lophophorates)

Extinct clade of lophophorates

Tommotiids are an extinct group of Cambrian invertebrates thought to be early total-group lophophorates (the group containing Bryozoa, Brachiopoda, and Phoronida), including members of the lophophorate stem group, as well as early diverging members of the crown group.

The majority of tommotiids are mineralised with calcium phosphate rather than calcium carbonate, although silicified examples hint that some species bore carbonate or carbonaceous sclerites.

Micrina and Paterimitra possess bivalved shells in their larval phases, which preserve characters that might position them in the Linguliformea and Rhynchonelliformea stem lineages respectively. This would indicate that the brachiopod shell represents the retention of a larval character.

For a long part of their history, the tommotiids were only known from disarticulated shells - a complete organism had not been found. The 2008 discovery of Eccentrotheca offered the first insight into a complete organism, and permitted a reconstruction of the animal as a sessile, tube-like animal made up of a spiral of overlapping plates. Articulated specimens of Paterimitra, discovered a year later, suggest a similar form and lifestyle - it is possible that many tommotiids need redescribing as sessile tube-dwellers. Eccentrotheca and other similar sessile tommotiids were likely filter feeders, similar to modern lophophorates.

However, the discovery of the articulated camenellan Wufengella showed that it was a free-living worm-like animal, suggesting that it was not a crown-group lophophorate, as the last living common ancestor of all living lophophorates has been predicted to be sessile, as bryozoans, brachiopods and phoronids are. This indicates that tommotiids are paraphyletic, with some tommotiids more closely related to bryozoans, brachiopods and phoronids than to other tommotiids.

These discoveries have produced an alternative model for the origin of the brachiopods; it suggested that they evolved by the reduction of sessile tube-like organisms, until only two shells were left. This contrasts with the brachiopod fold hypothesis which suggests that they formed by the folding of a halkieriid-like organism.

== Taxonomy ==
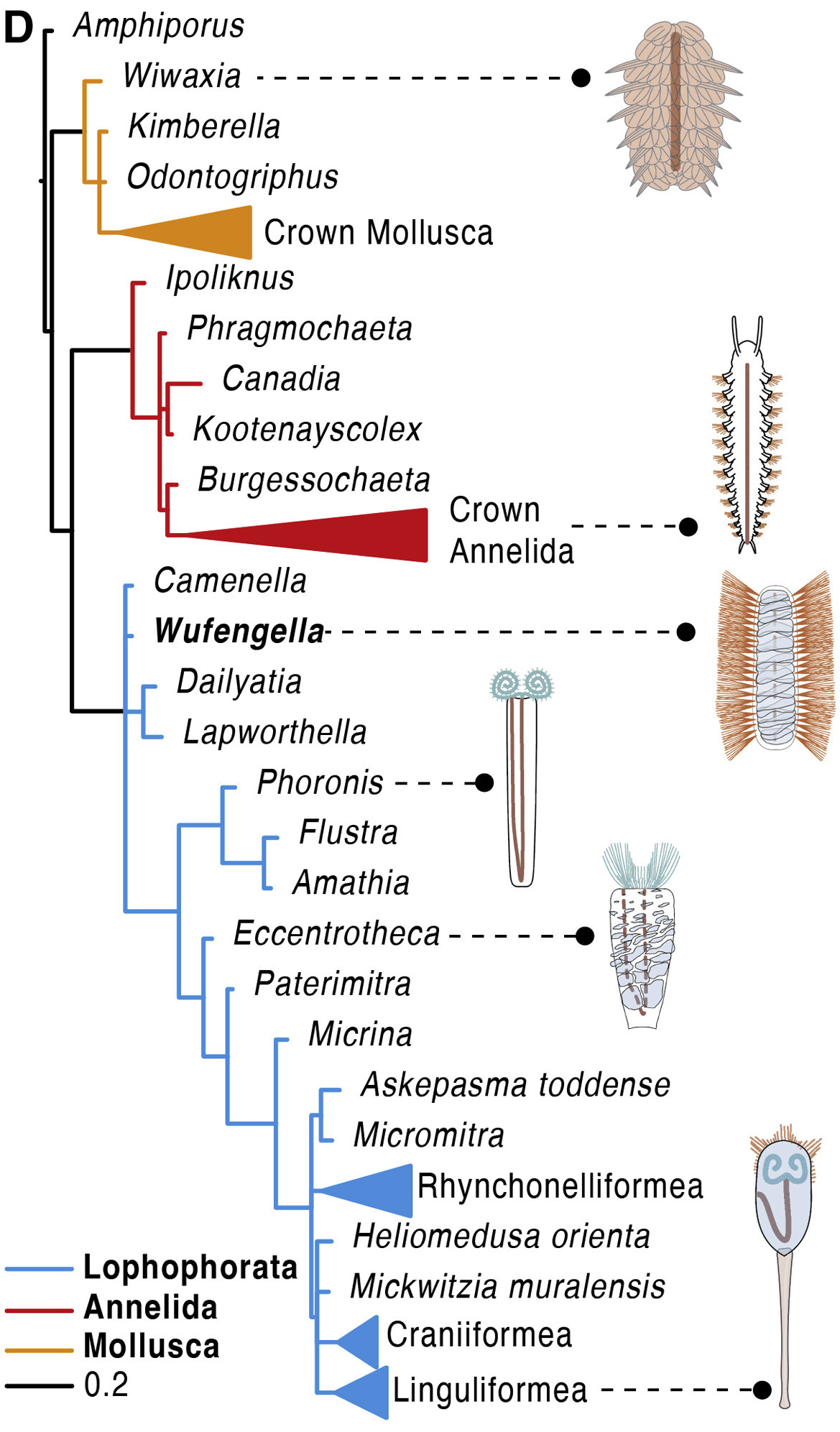
Phylogenetic tree of early lophophorates

Five families are recognized:

- Tommotiidae Missarzhevsky in Rozanov et al., 1969
- Tannuolinidae Fonin and Smirnova, 1967
- Sunnaginiidae Landing, 1984
- Kennardiidae Laurie, 1986
- Lapworthellidae Missarzhevsky in Rozanov and Missarzhevsky, 1966

Taxon	Relationship
Kulparina	Stem paterinid
Paterimitra	Stem paterinid
Askepasma	Stem (or crown?) paterinid
Tannuolina	Stem linguliform
Micrina	Stem Linguliform
Mickwitzia	Stem (or crown?) linguliform
Camenella	Stem brachiozoan
Dailyatia	Stem brachiozoan
Lapworthella	Stem brachiozoan
Eccentrotheca	Stem phoronid or brachiopod
Wufengella	Stem lophophorate
