= Evolution of brachiopods =

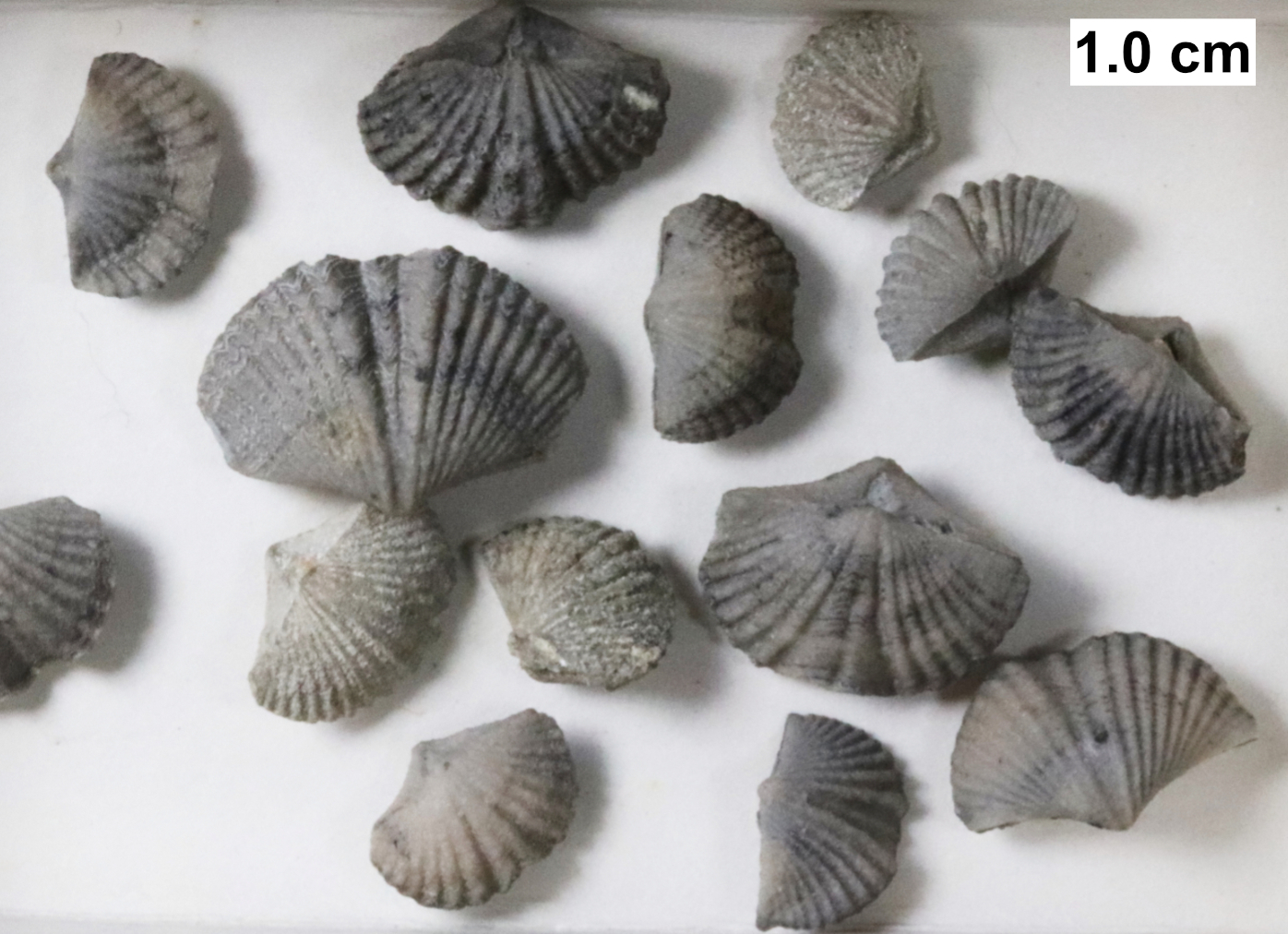
The Devonian brachiopod Tylothyris from the Milwaukee Formation, Milwaukee County, Wisconsin

The origin of the brachiopods is uncertain; they either arose from reduction of a multi-plated tubular organism, or from the folding of a slug-like organism with a protective shell on either end. Since their Cambrian origin, the phylum rose to a Palaeozoic dominance, but dwindled during the Mesozoic.

== Origins ==
=== Brachiopod fold hypothesis ===
The long-standing hypothesis of brachiopod origins, which has recently come under fire, suggests that the brachiopods arose by the folding of a Halkieria-like organism, which bore two protective shells at either end of a scaled body. The tannuolinids were thought to represent an intermediate form, although the fact that they do not, as thought, possess a scleritome means that this is now considered unlikely. Under this hypothesis, the Phoronid worms share a similar evolutionary history; molecular data also appear to indicate their membership of Brachiopoda.

Under the Brachiopod Fold Hypothesis, the "dorsal" and "ventral" valves would in fact represent an anterior and posterior shell. This would make the axes of symmetry consistent with that of other bilaterian phyla and appears to be consistent with the embryological development, in which the body axis folds to bring the shells from the dorsal surface to their mature position. Further support has been identified from the gene expression pattern during development, but on balance, developmental evidence speaks against the BFH.

More recent developmental studies have cast doubt on the BFH. Most significantly, the dorsal and ventral valves have significantly different origins; the dorsal (branchial) valve is secreted by dorsal epithelia, whereas the ventral (pedicle) valve corresponds to the cuticle of the pedicle, which becomes mineralized during development. Moreover, the dorsal and ventral valves of Lingula do not display the Hox gene expression patterns that would be expected if they were ancestrally 'anterior' and 'posterior'.

=== Tommotiids ===
The 'tommotiids' are an informal group of animals thought to be lophotrochozoans. Their remains are usually found as microfossils, entombed in carbonate as phosphatic sclerites(armor plates). While the sclerites are disarticulated in their fossil state, in life a huge number of them would have articulated and attached onto a soft-bodied animal. The taxonomical affinities of such animal have long been uncertain - they had been compared to other fossils known from armor plates/scales, such as Halkieria and the machaeridian worms.

Continuing research in the current century has brought on a new exciting perspective on the affinities of tommotiids: they are now being regarded as stem-group brachiopods. One crucial fossil linking the tommotiids with brachiopods is Micrina. Analysis on the microscopic inner structure of the phosphatic shell has shown similarities to the organophosphatic brachiopods, one of them being tubes - that must have housed setae in life - perforating the shell layers. Setigerous tubes have also been found in early brachiopods, like the Paterinates for example. A later publication (Holmer et al. 2008) asserted that Micrina was a bivalved animal not unlike a brachiopod, having only two armor plates in life. Tommotiid sclerites can be classified by their shape, and most had two types of them: the sellate sclerite and the mitral sclerite. In this model Micrina had one of each. The sellate and mitral sclerites of tommotiids would end up becoming dorsal(brachial) and ventral(pedicle) valves respectively.

Another crucial find would be the discovery of (partially) articulated tommotiids. The first of these is Eccentrotheca, and the second Paterimitra. Unlike the traditional view of them being slug-like animals comparable to Halkieria, the articulated exoskeleton suggest that they were sessile filter feeders, just like the brachiopods and their sister-group phoronids. Their shell microstructure, again, show similarity to the Paterinate brachiopods, especially in their primary mineralised layer.

=== Appearance of the brachiopod crown-group ===
The earliest unequivocal brachiopod fossils appeared in the early Cambrian Period. One of the oldest known brachiopods is Aldanotreta sunnaginensis from the lowest Tommotian Stage, early Cambrian of Siberia. It was thought to be the oldest known until the brachiopod Khasagtina primaria was identified in Upper Fortunian strata.

== The question of Paterinata ==
The brachiopod class Paterinata is an organophosphatic-shelled group that includes some of the oldest brachiopods known. They are usually considered as members of Linguliformea, being sister-groups with the similarly organophosphatic lingulates. However, paterinates possess a number of traits that resemble the 'articulate' brachiopods more than lingulates. Their adductor muscle scars are oriented postero-medially like the rhynchonelliforms. They have a strophic (straight) hinge line, which resemble early articulate groups like the orthids. Their mantle canal system houses gonads (like the craniiforms) and have exclusively marginal vascula terminalia. This mosaic of traits lead to a repeated suggestion of the possibility that paterinates(or at least a few of them) could be very early diverging members separate from the lingulates. Their shell microstructure also seems to be closer to the stem-brachiopod tommotiids, though this is something that was brought up later down the line.

== Decline ==
Brachiopods are extremely common fossils throughout the Palaeozoic. During the Ordovician and Silurian periods, brachiopods became adapted to life in most marine environments and became particularly numerous in shallow water habitats, in some cases forming whole banks in much the same way as bivalves (such as mussels) do today. In some places, large sections of limestone strata and reef deposits are composed largely of their shells.

The major shift came with the Permian extinction, as a result of the Mesozoic marine revolution. Before the extinction event, brachiopods were more numerous and diverse than bivalve mollusks. Afterwards, in the Mesozoic, their diversity and numbers were drastically reduced and they were largely replaced by bivalve molluscs. Molluscs continue to dominate today, and the remaining orders of brachiopods survive largely in fringe environments.

It has been suggested that the slow decline of the brachiopods since is a direct result of the rise in diversity of filter-feeding bivalve mollusks, which were thought to have ousted the brachiopods from their former habitats; however, the bivalves have undergone a steady rise in diversity since their appearance in the Cambrian, and their abundance is unrelated to that of the brachiopods; further, many bivalves occupy niches (e.g. burrowing) which many brachiopods never inhabited.

Alternative possibilities for their demise include the increasing disturbance of sediments by roving deposit feeders (including many burrowing bivalves); the increased intensity and variety of shell-crushing predation strategies; or that they were simply unable to recover from the End-Permian extinction.

== See also ==
- Taxonomy of the Brachiopoda
- Brachiopods−related topics
  - Paleozoic brachiopods
  - Mesozoic brachiopods
