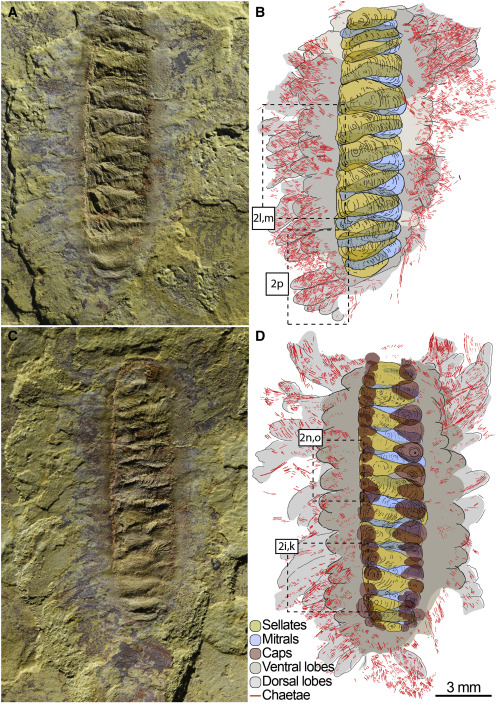

Scientific classification
- Kingdom: Animalia
- Superphylum: Lophotrochozoa
- Order: Tommotiida
- Genus: †Wufengella; Guo et al., 2022
- Species: †W. bengtsoni

Binomial name
- †Wufengella bengtsoni Guo et al., 2022

= Wufengella =

Wufengella Temporal range: Early Cambrian

Extinct genus of invertebrates

Wufengella is a genus of extinct camenellan "tommotiid" that lived during the Early Cambrian (Stage 3). Described in 2022, the only species Wufengella bengtsoni was discovered from the Maotianshan Shales of Chiungchussu (Qiongzhusi) Formation in Yunnan, China. The fossil indicates that the animal was an armoured worm that close to the common ancestry of the phyla Brachiozoa and Bryozoa, which are collectively grouped into a clade called Lophophorata.

== Discovery ==
Wufengella is known from a single specimen. The fossil was discovered by Chinese palaeontologists Jin Guo and Peiyun Cong at the Yunnan University. An almost complete fossil, parts of the anterior end are missing. The location of the specimen, Chiungchussu Formation at Haikou, Kunming, Southwest China, is member of the Chengjiang Lagerstätte that is established to belong to Cambrian Stage 3 (between 521 and 514 million year ago). The same fossil deposit had yielded worm-like lobopod Facivermis and Cambrian chordate (myllokunmingiid) among other animal fossils.

The name Wufengalla is after the Wufeng Hill in Chengjiang. Wufeng is a Chinese word for "dancing/flying phoenix." The species name was given to honour Stefan Bengtson, a palaeontologist at the Swedish Museum of Natural History. The specimen (CJHMD00041) is maintained at the Nature Museum of Yunnan. Luke A. Parry at the University of Oxford identified the specimen as a tommotiid worm, and the description was published in Current Biology.

== Description ==
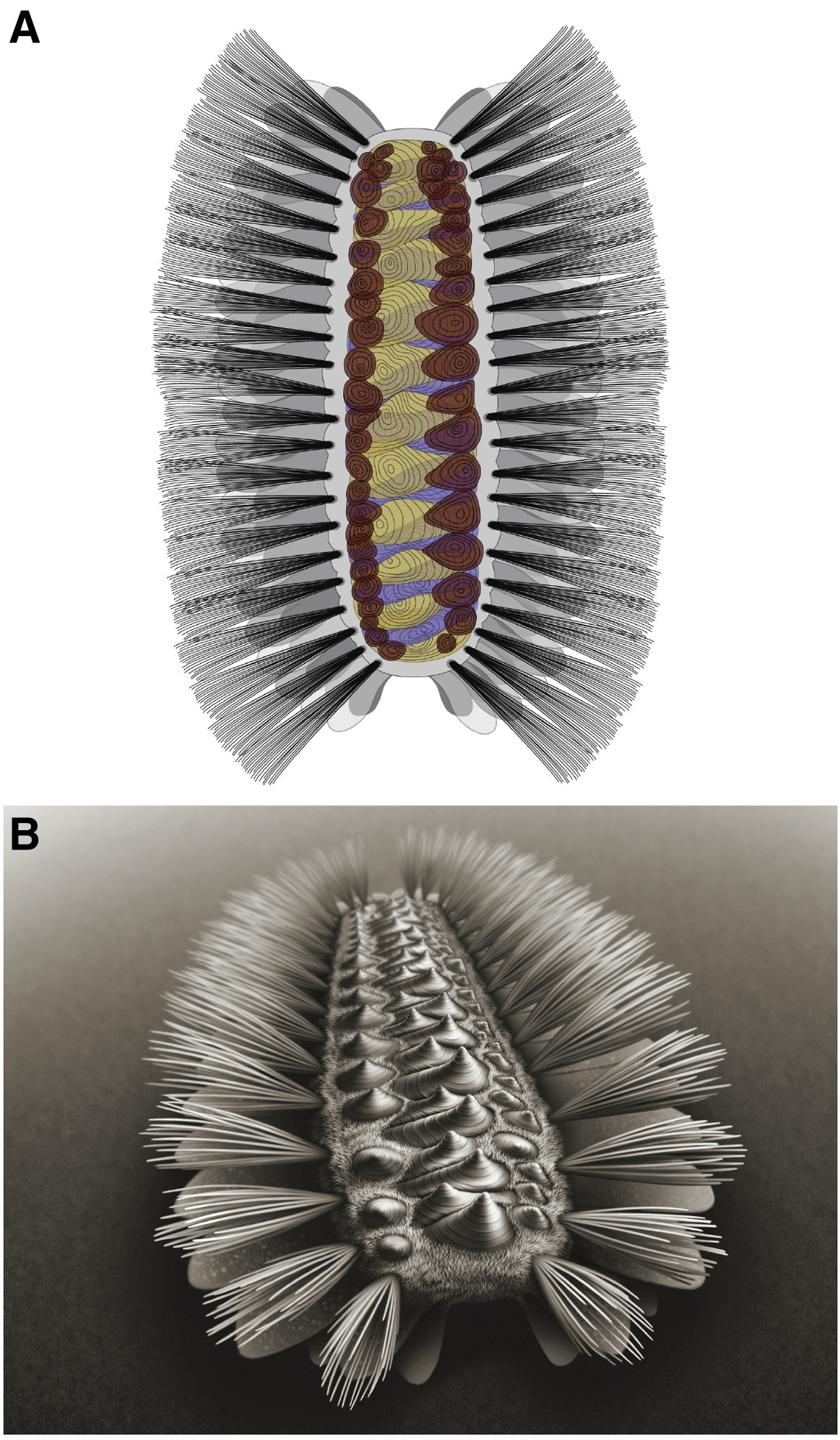
Interpretive drawing (top) and life restoration (bottom)

From a partially incomplete fossil, Wufengella is known to have an elongated body that measures about 16 mm (0.63 in) long. It has long bristles on both sides of the body that are presumed to be sensory organs for detecting their immediate surrounding such as approaching predators. It also has flap-like structures that could be suction organs for attachment to objects. In contrast to its related lophophorates which are fixed to sea floors, Wufengella was likely actively mobile.

The back (dorsal) side of Wufengella is studded with armoured plates called sclerites. The sclerites are arranged almost randomly (bilaterally asymmetrical) throughout the body. However, there is some pattern of organisation. The larger major sclerites are aligned in two rows along the body length, and the tiny minor ones are distributed unevenly in between the two major rows.

== Evolutionary importance ==
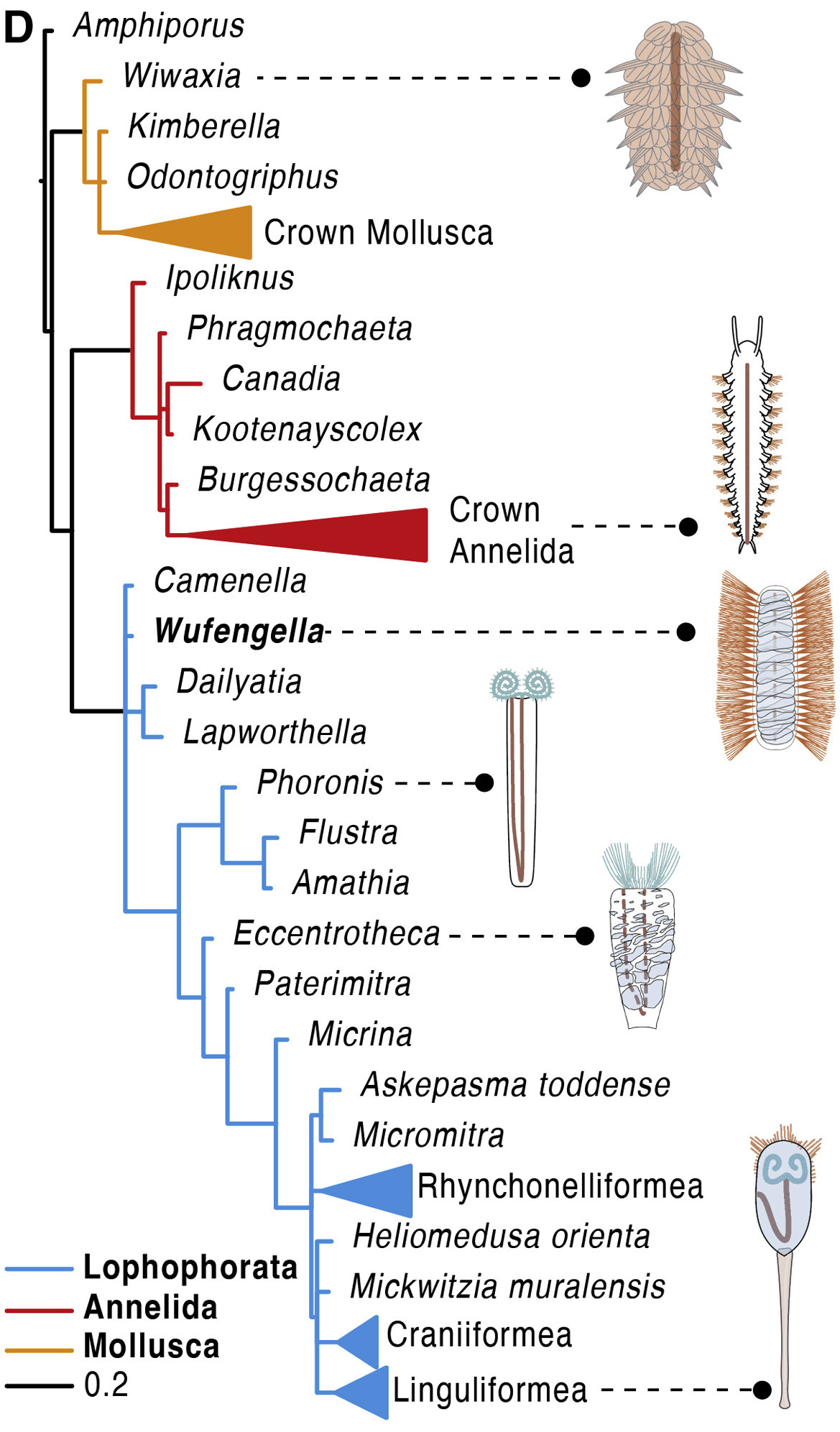
Phylogenetic position of Wufengella

Wufengella has two important features that contribute to evolutionary changes in ancient invertebrate group, the lophophorates, that include the tommotiids as one group. One feature is the presence of sclerites, which is a common structure that distinguishes tommotiid species. In all groups, except the tannuolinids (such as Micrina), the sclerites are asymmetrical. The structure and distribution of sclerites indicate the linkage between the different groups.

Another feature is body segmentation. The arrangement of the sclerites and the bristles indicate that the body is transversely segmented as in modern annelid worms. This suggest that Wufengella could be related to the common ancestor of annelids and brachiopods. In addition, the over structure indicates that it could be close to the common ancestry Phonorida, Brachiozoa and Bryozoa. The three phyla are established to constitute the same evolutionary lineage and are collectively grouped into a clade called Lophophorata. It has been predicted that the last common ancestor of the lophophorates would be a sessile, lophophore-bearing suspension feeder having U-shaped gut (called lophophore), The fact that Wufengella was mobile implies that it lies outside the crown group of Lophophorata.
