= Kryptotrochozoa =

Scientific classification
- Domain: Eukaryota
- Kingdom: Animalia
- Subkingdom: Eumetazoa
- Clade: ParaHoxozoa
- Clade: Bilateria
- Clade: Nephrozoa
- Clade: Protostomia
- Clade: Spiralia
- Superphylum: Lophotrochozoa
- Clade: Kryptotrochozoa; Giribet et al., 2009

Clades
- Nemertea; Lophophorata

Taxonomic clade

The Kryptotrochozoa (incl. Entoprocta + Ectoprocta) are a proposed Lophotrochozoa clade. It consists of the Nemertea and Lophophorata. It is controversial.

- Lophotrochozoa
  - Cycliophora
  - Annelida
  - - Mollusca
    - Kryptotrochozoa
      - Lophophorata
        - Brachiozoa
          - Brachiopoda
          - Phoronida
        - Bryozoa s.l.
          - Entoprocta
          - Ectoprocta
      - Nemertea
