= Tumulduria =

Tumulduria Temporal range: lower Cambrian

Scientific classification
- Domain: Eukaryota
- Kingdom: Animalia
- Phylum: Brachiopoda
- Class: †Paterinata
- Order: †Paterinida
- Family: †Cryptotretidae
- Genus: †Tumulduria

Extinct genus of brachiopods

Tumulduria is a Cambrian small shelly fossil. It is phosphatic, and approximately bilaterally symmetrical. It was first described by Missazhevskii (1969: English translation in Rozanov et al. 1981, p. 204-205) from the Tommotian Stage of the Aldan River. It represents part of a pateriniid brachiopod.

Growth lamellae are evident; like the machaeridians, they overlap along the axis of symmetry. Overall, Tumulduria consists of a central, slightly rounded ridge, with two lateral 'flaps', giving it an appearance superficially resembling a trilobite's head-shield.; indeed, it has been in considered in the past to be a trilobite (Federov et al. 1977). However, it is probably phosphatic, unlike trilobites, and it the details of its morphology do not conform to that of trilobites. As such it excited considerable interest and controversy as suggesting the presence of trilobites in the Tommotian, purportedly a pre-trilobite period. However, this has not been borne up by subsequent study.
