= Tannuolina =

Scientific classification
- Domain: Eukaryota
- Kingdom: Animalia
- Family: †Tannuolinidae
- Genus: †Tannuolina; Fonin & Smirnova, 1967

Type species
- Tannuolina multifora Fonin & Smirnova, 1967

Species
- T. fonini; T. maroccana; T. multifora; T. pavlovi; T. zhangwentangi

Extinct genus of brachiopods

Tannuolina is a genus of tommotiid, belonging to the brachiopod stem lineage.

Its phosphatic shells exhibit a complex series of open pores/chambers/channels in outer shell layer. It is conventionally interpreted as an essentially bivalved organism, similar to Micrina, though some use the unequal ratio of stellate to mitrate sclerites to argue for a halkieriid-like anatomy.

More recently a tube-like construction inspired by Eccentrotheca has been proposed.

== Species ==
- T. fonini Esakova in Esakova & Zhegallo, 1996
- T. maroccana Skovsted & Clausen in Skovsted, Clausen, Álvaro & Ponlevé, 2014
- T. multifora Fonin & Smirnova, 1967
- T. pavlovi Kouchinsky et al., 2010
- T. zhangwentangi Qian & Bengtson, 1989
