= Mickwitzia =

Mickwitzia Temporal range: Terreneuvian–mid Cambrian

Scientific classification
- Domain: Eukaryota
- Kingdom: Animalia
- Clade: Brachiozoa
- Stem group: Brachiopoda
- Family: †Mickwitziidae; Goryanskii, 1969
- Genus: †Mickwitzia; Schmidt, 1888

Species
- M. monilifera (type) (Linnarsson, 1869); M. formosa (Wiman, 1902); M. muralensis Walcott, 1913; M. lochmanae McMenamin, 1992; M. multipunctata McMenamin, 1992

Extinct genus of brachiopods

Mickwitziids are a Cambrian group of shelly fossils with originally phosphatic valves, belonging to the Brachiopod stem group, and exemplified by the genus Mickwitzia – the other genera are Heliomedusa (a possible junior synonym of Mickwitzia?) and Setatella. The family Mickwitziidae is conceivably paraphyletic with respect to certain crown-group brachiopods.

== Shell microstructure ==
Punctae or tubes penetrate through multiple shell wall layers, and individual punctae often develop a single, axial phosphatic tube. The shell comprises multiple phosphatic laminae; the region closest to the edge of the shell was presumably more organic-walled than phosphatized as it tends to be more flimsily preserved.

Members of the genus appear to share characteristic shell microstructure in common with Tommotiids such as Micrina, and like this taxon, mickwitziids may not have been able to enclose their entire body within a bivalved shell.

The shells are punctuated with inward-directed hollow cones, conceivably associated with setae – though intact setae are exceptionally preserved along the margin of mickwitziid shells yet not found emanating from the cones, which have no evidence of ever incorporating setae.

== Included taxa ==
- Mickwitzia
- Oymurania
- Setatella

=== Heliomedusa ===
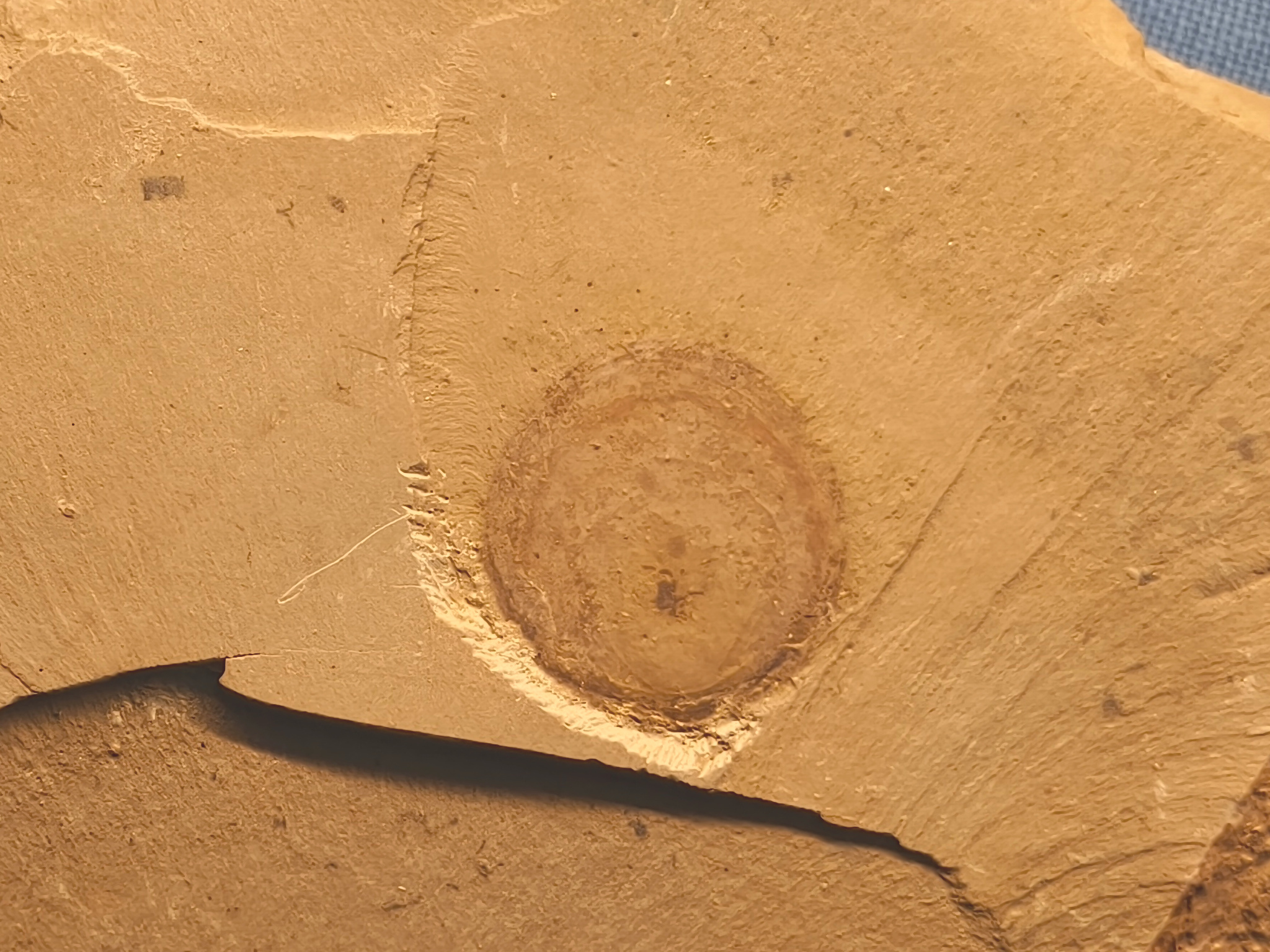
Fossil of Heliomedusa

Heliomedusa orienta was first interpreted as a jellyfish - hence its name - but is now affiliated with Mickwitzia, as well as Craniopsids and Disciniids.

A craniid affinity has long been on the cards, and was the position of the Treatise.

In 2007 a new interpretation reconstructed Heliomedusa as being the other way up - swapping the identity of the dorsal and ventral valves. On this view it was interpreted as a disciniid.

This met with a mixed reception in the updated treatise and was rejected by Zhang et al. 2009

Zhang et al. (2009) state without argument that the ventral valve is larger than the dorsal valve, and argue that the ventral valve was situated downwards in living Heliomedusa. They argue that the pedicle identified by Chen et al. (2007), and central to their "ventral valve as dorsal" argument, was instead an internal structure corresponding to an infilled gut.

== Affinity ==
Mickwitziids are stem-group brachiopods, with links to the tommotiid grade. Mickwitzia itself is conceivably synonymous with Heliomedusa.

== Distribution ==
The oldest mickwitziid dates to the Terreneuvian.
