= Yuganotheca =

Yuganotheca Temporal range: Cambrian Stage 3

Scientific classification
- Kingdom: Animalia
- Clade: Lophophorata
- Genus: †Yuganotheca; Zhang et al., 2014
- Species: †Y. elegans

Binomial name
- †Yuganotheca elegans Zhang et al., 2014

Extinct monospecific genus of lophophorates

Yuganotheca is an extinct monospecific genus of lophophorates that lived in the Heilinpu Formation during Cambrian Stage 3. Its type and only species is Yuganotheca elegans.
