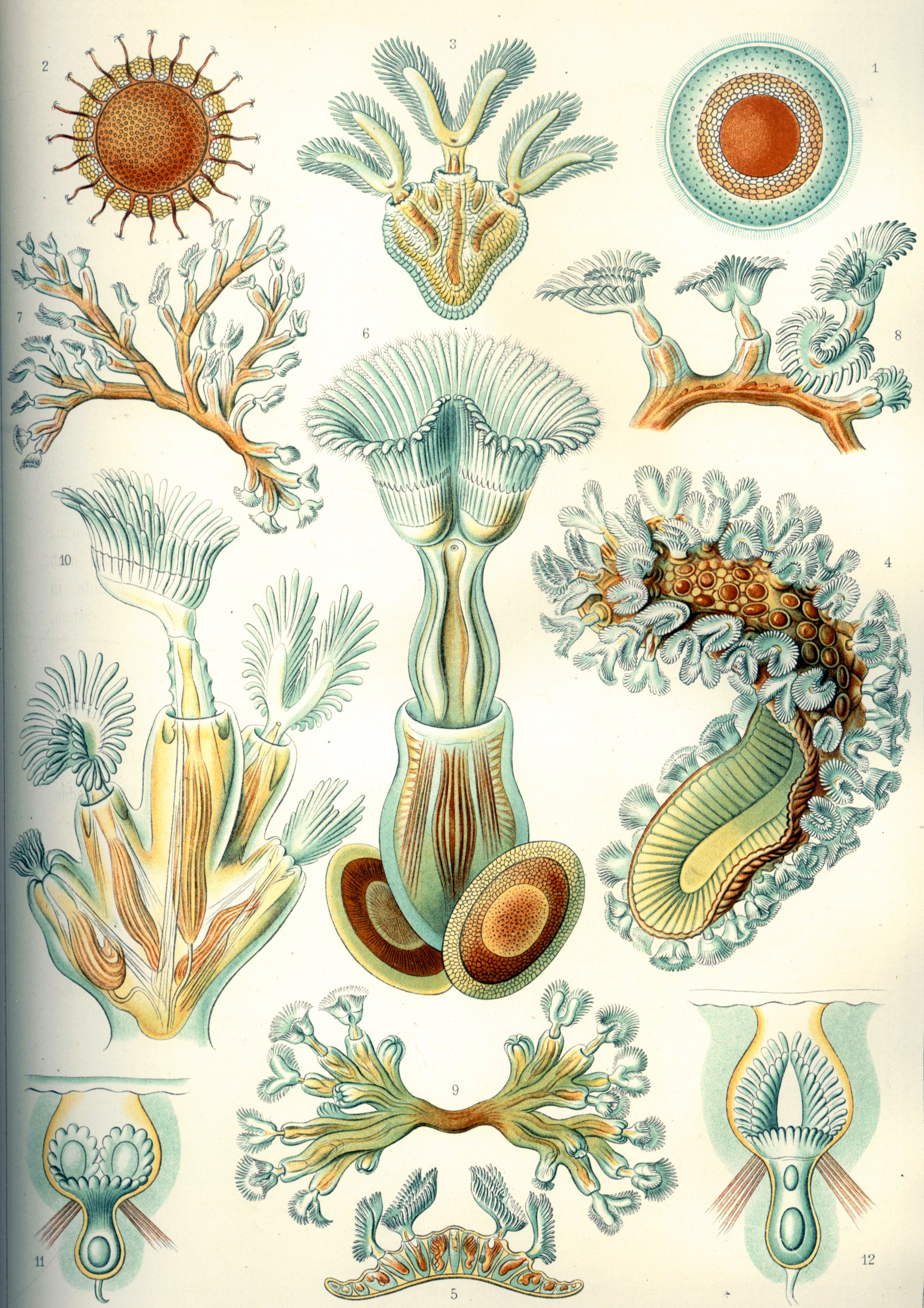
- Bryozoa
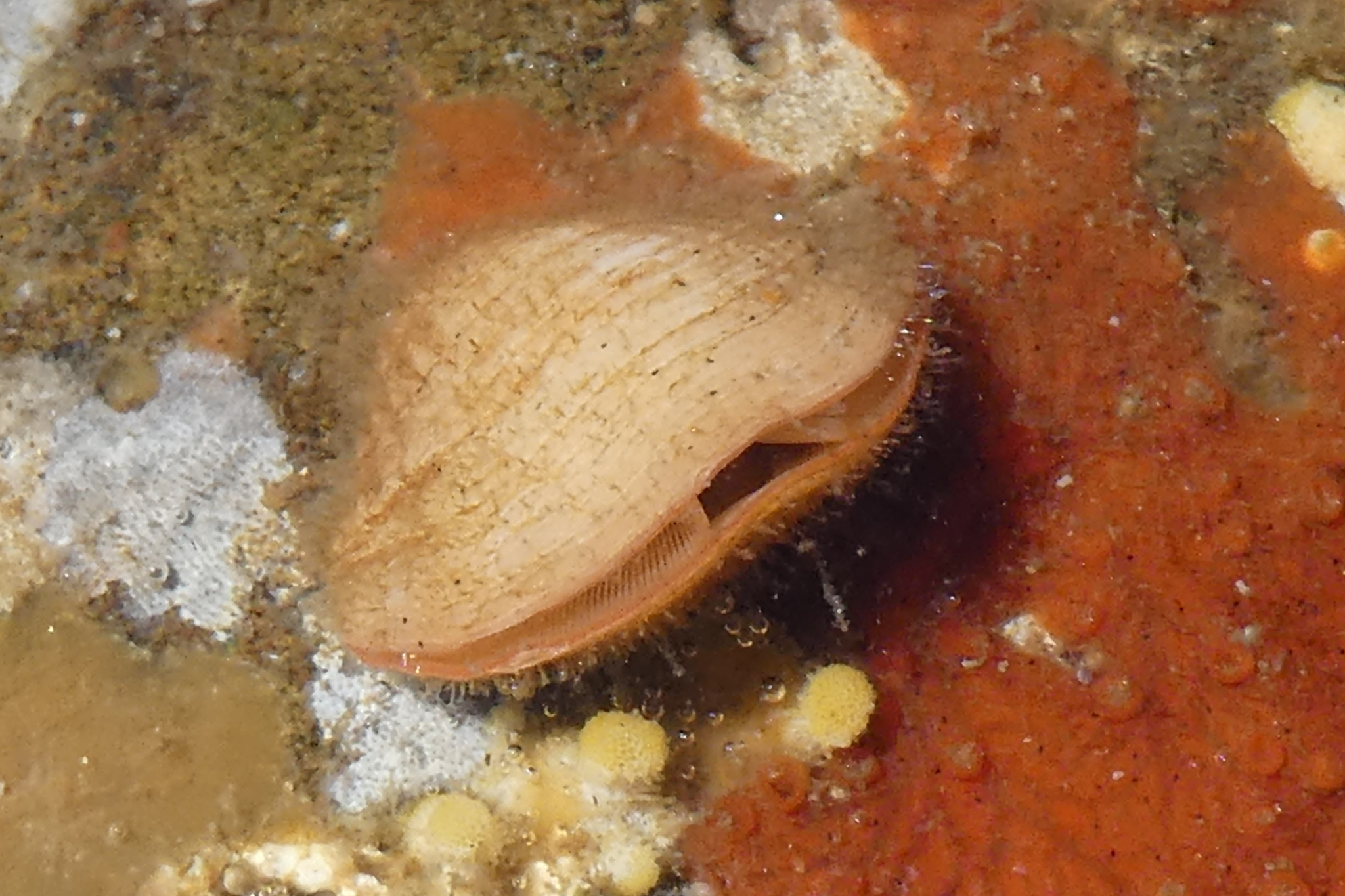
- Brachiopod (Terebratalia transversa)

Scientific classification
- Kingdom: Animalia
- Subkingdom: Eumetazoa
- Clade: ParaHoxozoa
- Clade: Bilateria
- Clade: Nephrozoa
- Clade: Protostomia
- Clade: Spiralia
- Superphylum: Lophotrochozoa
- Clade: Lophophorata; Meglitsch, 1972

Clades
- †"Tommotiida" (paraphyletic); †Tentaculita; Brachiopoda; †Hyolitha?; Phoronida; Bryozoa; Entoprocta?; †Yuganotheca

Synonyms
- Tentaculata Hatschek, 1888

= Lophophorata =

Lophophorata Temporal range: Early Cambrian –Recent

Group of animals with a lophophore

The Lophophorata (also called Tentaculata; not to be confused with Tentaculata Eschscholtz 1825, a class within the Ctenophora) are a lophotrochozoan clade consisting of the Brachiozoa and the Bryozoa. They have a lophophore. On morphological grounds lophophorates have been assessed as deuterostomes, but molecular phylogenetic analyses suggest that they are protostomes. Fossil finds of the "tommotiid" Wufengella suggest that they evolved from worm-like animals that resembled annelids. The phylogenetic relationships between these groups are as follows:

- Lophotrochozoa
  - Annelida
  - - Mollusca
    - Kryptotrochozoa
      - Lophophorata
        - Brachiozoa
          - Brachiopoda
          - Phoronida
        - Bryozoa s.l.
          - Entoprocta
          - Ectoprocta
      - Nemertea
