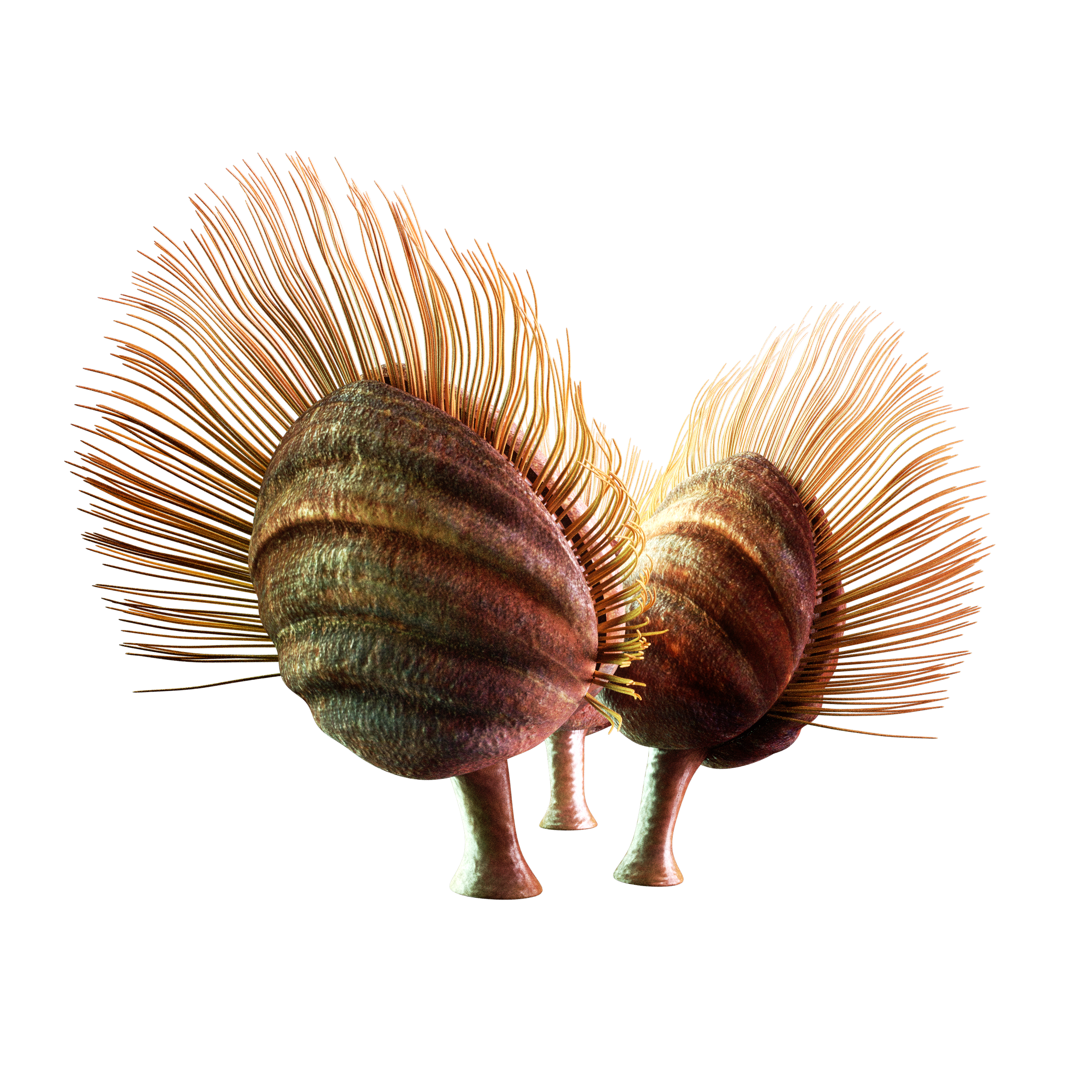
- Micromitra Undosa, Estonian Museum of Natural History

Scientific classification
- Domain: Eukaryota
- Kingdom: Animalia
- Phylum: Brachiopoda
- Class: †Paterinata
- Order: †Paterinida
- Family: †Paterinidae
- Genus: †Micromitra; Meek, 1873

Species
- M. sculptilis Meek, 1873 (type); M. phillipsi Holl, 1865; M. ornatella Linnarsson, 1876; M. burgessensis Walcott, 1908; M. modesta Lochman, 1940; M. semicircularis Imanaliev and Pelman 1988; M. nerranubawu Kruse, 1990

= Micromitra =

Micromitra Temporal range: middle Early Cambrian–Upper Cambrian

Extinct genus of brachiopods

Micromitra is a genus of brachiopods known from the Middle Cambrian Burgess Shale. 160 specimens of Micromitra are known from the Greater Phyllopod bed, where they comprise 0.3% of the community.
