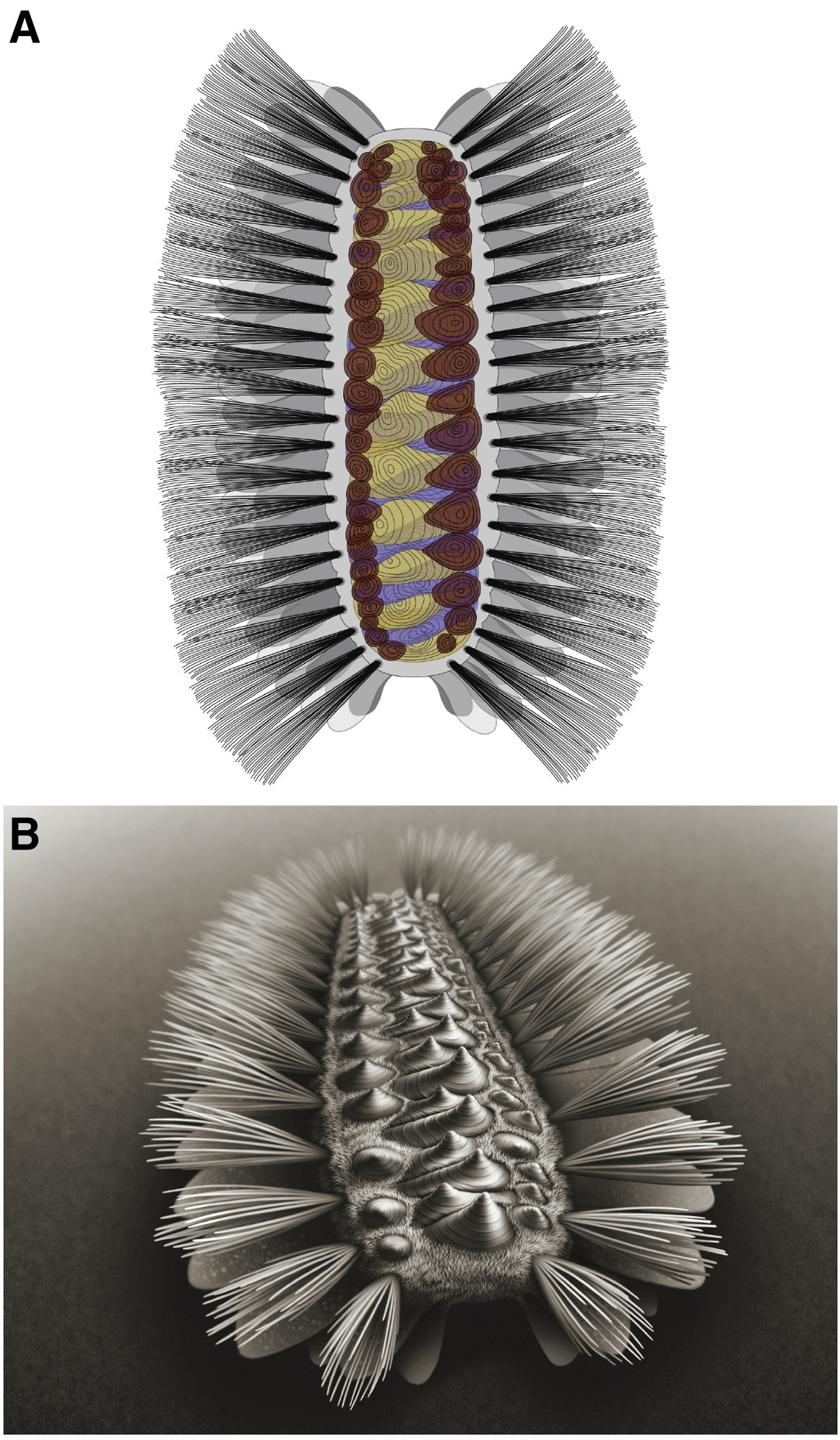
- Reconstruction and life restoration of the camenellan Wufengella

Scientific classification
- Kingdom: Animalia
- Order: Tommotiida
- Informal group: †Camenellans

Genera
- Camenella Missarzhevsky in Rozanov & Missarzhevsky, 1966; Dailyatia Bischoff, 1976; Kelanella Missarzhevsky in Rozanov & Missarzhevsky, 1966; = Bengtsonia, Tesella, Sonella; Kennardia Laurie, 1986; Lapworthella; Shetlandia Wrona, 2004; Wufengella Guo et al. 2022

= Camenellan =

Camenellan Temporal range: Early Cambrian

Extinct informal group of invertebrates

Reconstruction of the scleritome of Dailyatia bacata

The camenellans, consisting of the genera Camenella, Dailyatia, Kennardia, Kelanella, Wufengella and Lapworthella, are a (probably monophyletic) group of Tommotiid invertebrates from the Cambrian period, reconstructed as sister to all other lophophorates (plus brachiopods and phoronids). They are primarily known from isolated sclerites, but are believed to have a scleritomous, Halkieria-like construction. This was confirmed by the discovery of Wufengella, known from articulated remains, which showed camenellans to be mobile, worm-like animals.

Dailyatia and Camenella have distinct dorsal (symmetrical) and lateral (asymmetric) sclerite morphologies. The same has been asserted for Lapworthella even though that has not always been the common perception.

It has been argued that Camenella, Kelanella and Lapworthella, assuming a slug-like anatomy, had an anterior 'head valve' followed by pairs of asymmetric valves running in pairs along their dorsal surface.

The 'head valve' in Lapworthella - that is the bilaterally symmetric Morph A valve - is thought to have fused from two ontogenetically separate sclerites. Dailyatia has a similar double-mounded structure at the tip of its A type sclerites.

Growth rings in all are marked out by prominent external ridges.

== Taxonomy ==
Two families:

Kennardiidae Laurie, 1986: three sclerite morphs, one of which (conventionally termed the A morph) is bilaterally symmetrical, the other two occurring in sinistral and dextral variants. Includes Kennardia and Dailyatia, and questionably Shetlandia

Lapworthellidae: sclerites occur in something of a morphological continuum, but essentially form a single type with a sinistral and dextral version, possibly with the anterior-most pair of sclerites fusing into a single bilaterally-symmetrical, dual-tipped sclerite.

Dailyatia species:

- D. ajax Bischoff, 1976 (type)
- D. bacata Skovsted et al., 2015
- D. braddocki Evans & Rowell, 1990
- D. decobruta Betts, 2019
- D. helica Skovsted et al., 2015
- D. macroptera (Tate, 1892)
- D. odyssei Evans & Rowell, 1990
