= Paterina =

Paterina Temporal range: Miaolingian – ~508 Ma

Scientific classification
- Kingdom: Animalia
- Phylum: Brachiopoda
- Class: †Paterinata
- Order: †Paterinida
- Family: †Paterinidae
- Genus: †Paterina; Beecher, 1891

Extinct genus of brachiopods

Paterina is a genus of brachiopods known from the Middle Cambrian Burgess Shale. 18 specimens of Paterina are known from the Greater Phyllopod bed, where they comprise 0.03% of the community.
