= Aldanotreta =

Aldanotreta Temporal range: Cambrian Stage 2

Scientific classification
- Kingdom: Animalia
- Phylum: Brachiopoda
- Class: †Paterinata
- Order: †Paterinida
- Family: †Cryptotretidae
- Genus: †Aldanotreta; Pelman, 1977

Extinct genus of brachiopods

Aldanotreta is an extinct genus of brachiopods dating from the Tommotian (early Cambrian) of Siberia. It is one of the earliest brachiopods. Living relatives are found in the genus Lingula.
