= Askepasma =

Askepasma Temporal range: Early Cambrian

Scientific classification
- Domain: Eukaryota
- Kingdom: Animalia
- Phylum: Brachiopoda
- Class: †Paterinata
- Order: †Paterinida
- Family: †Cryptotretidae
- Genus: †Askepasma; Laurie, 1986

Species
- A. toddense Laurie, 1986 (type); A. transversalis Peng et al., 2010; A. saproconcha Topper et al., 2012

Extinct genus of brachiopods

Askepasma is an extinct genus of brachiopods which existed in what is now Australia and southern China during the Lower Cambrian.

The type species is A. toddense. A. transversalis occurs in Guizhou, and A. saproconcha is the oldest known southern Australian brachiopod from the lower Cambrian.
