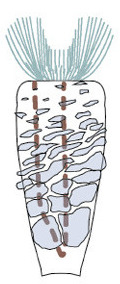
- Life restoration

Scientific classification
- Domain: Eukaryota
- Kingdom: Animalia
- Grade: "Tommotiida"
- Genus: †Eccentrotheca; Landing, Nowlan & Fletcher, 1980

= Eccentrotheca =

Eccentrotheca Temporal range: Early Cambrian

Extinct genus of marine organisms

Eccentrotheca is a genus of "tommotiid" known from Cambrian deposits. Its sclerites form rings that are stacked to produce a widening-upwards conical scleritome. Individual plates have been homologized with the valves of brachiopods, and a relationship with the phoronids is also likely at a stem-group level. Its pointed end terminated in a stub that probably fastened it to a hard sea floor; its open end has been interpreted as a filter-feeding aperture.
