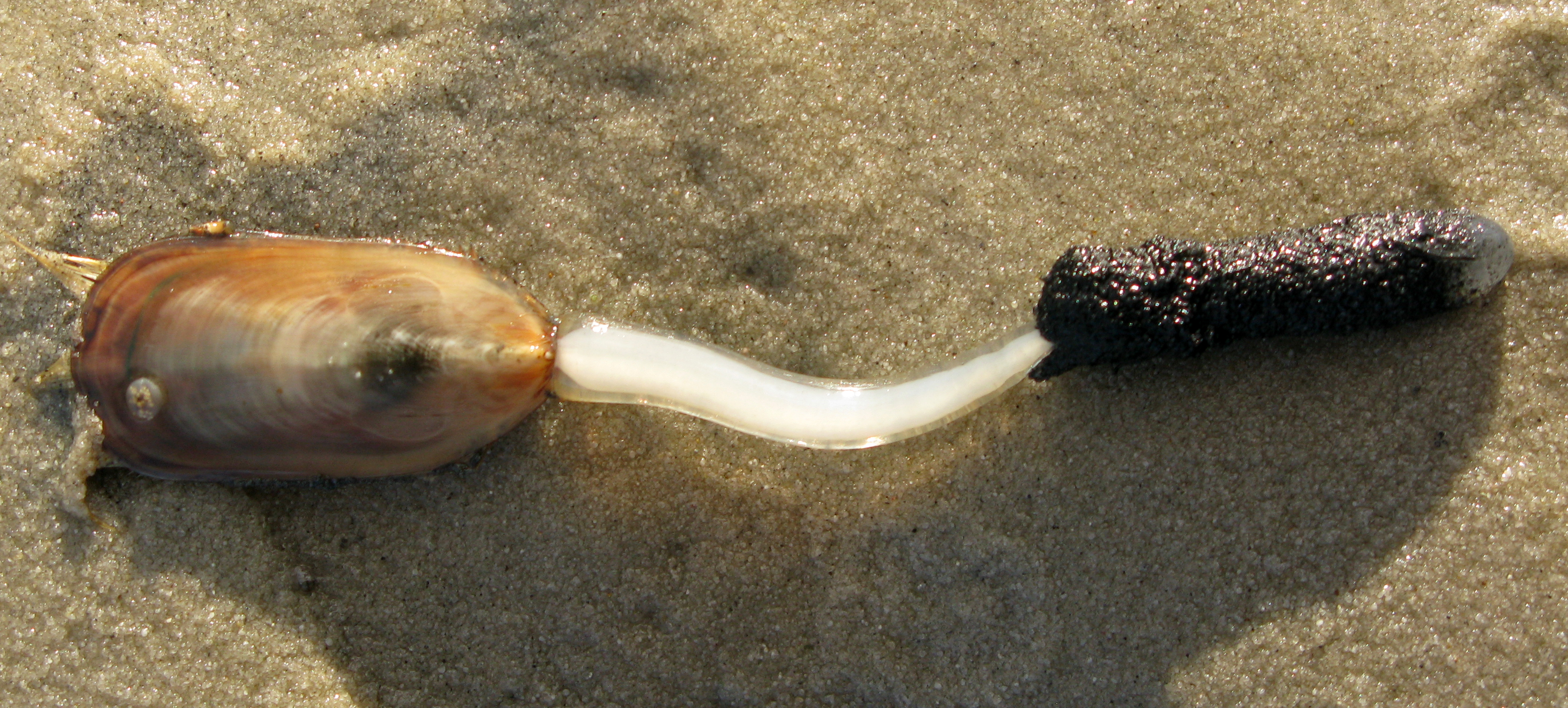
- Lingula anatina from Stradbroke Island, Australia

Scientific classification
- Kingdom: Animalia
- Phylum: Brachiopoda
- Subphylum: Linguliformea; Williams et al. 1996

Classes
- Lingulata Gorjansky and Popov 1985; †Paterinata Rowell 1965

= Linguliformea =

Linguliformea Temporal range: Lower Cambrian–Recent

Subphylum of brachiopod

Linguliformea is a subphylum of inarticulate brachiopods. These were the earliest of brachiopods, ranging from the Cambrian into the Holocene. They rapidly diversified during the Cambrian into the Ordovician, but most families became extinct by the end of the Devonian.

The articulation in these brachiopods is lacking. These brachiopods have adductor and oblique muscles, but no diductor muscles. The anus is located at the side of the body. The pedicle is a hollow extension of the ventral body wall. Posterior body wall separates dorsal and ventral mantles.

The shells are usually made up of apatite (calcium phosphate), however rare cases have calcite or aragonite shells.

== See also ==
- Paleozoic brachiopods
