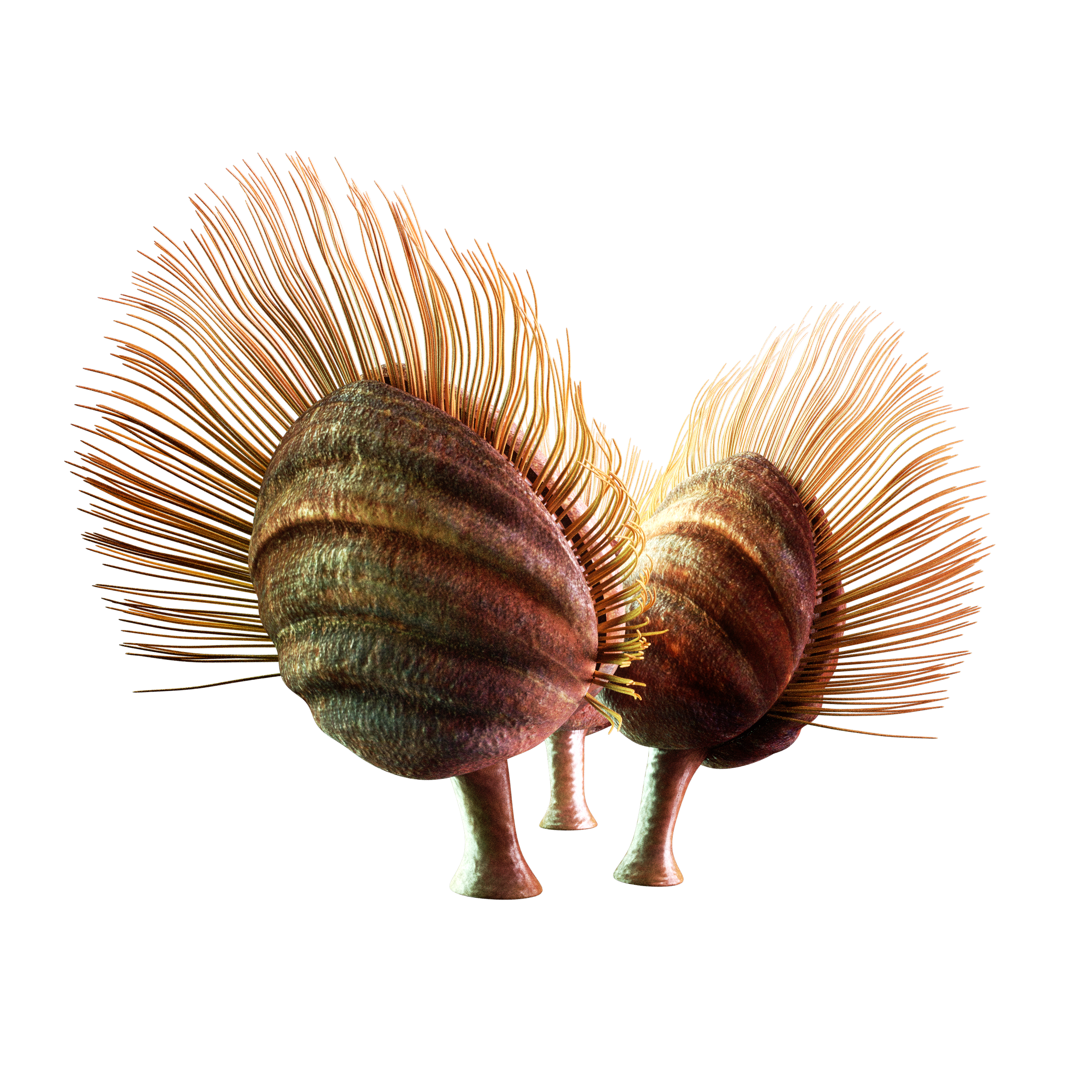
- Micromitra undosa

Scientific classification
- Kingdom: Animalia
- Phylum: Brachiopoda
- Class: †Paterinata; Williams et al., 1996
- Order: †Paterinida; Rowell, 1965
- Superfamily: †Paterinoidea; Schuchert, 1893

= Paterinata =

Paterinata Temporal range: Tommotian–Upper Ordovician

Extinct class of marine lamp shells

Paterinata is an extinct class of linguliform brachiopods which lived from the lower Cambrian ("Tommotian") to the Upper Ordovician (Hirnantian). It contains the single order Paterinida and the superfamily Paterinoidea. Despite being some of the earliest brachiopods to appear in the fossil record, paterinides stayed as a relatively subdued and low-diversity group even as other brachiopods diversified later in the Cambrian and Ordovician. Paterinides are notable for their high degree of convergent evolution with rhynchonelliform (articulate) brachiopods, which have a similar set of muscles and hinge-adjacent structures.

== Anatomy ==
Paterinides had organo-phosphatic shells which were ventribiconvex (both valves convex, the ventral valve moreso) and strophic (with a straight hinge line). Shell ornamentation usually consists of concentric fila (fine ridges) and tiny pits. The tiny larval shell has a smooth outer halo and strongly ornamented inner portion. There are no canals in the shell microstructure.

=== Hinge structures ===
When seen from behind, each valve appears triangular, with a system of superimposed plates and furrows along the hinge. Each valve has a broad triangular depression edging the hinge, known as a pseudointerarea. The middle of each pseudointerarea hosts a narrower excavation or furrow, known as a notothyrium (in the dorsal valve) or a delthyrium (in the ventral valve). Finally, these furrows may be partially covered by a convex plate-like overgrowth, known as a homeochilidium (in the dorsal valve) or a homeodeltidium (in the ventral valve). The furrow-and-plate pairing creates closed pockets near the hinge, where the pedicle presumably emerged.

=== Soft tissue ===
The musculature of paterinides seemingly relied on a small number of broad muscles within the shell. There are a pair of large triangular muscle scars near the hinge of the ventral valve, conjoining under the homeodeltidium. There are two pairs of scars in the dorsal valve, one pair set medially (at the center of the shell) and the other set posterolaterally (further back and outwards). These major scars likely correspond to adductor muscles, which close the shell. A subtle pit was present at the tip of the homeochilidium, possibly hosting diductor muscles, which open the shell. Diductor muscles are otherwise only found in articulate brachiopods. The network of mantle canals usually had a saccate form, emphasizing a pair of midline canals (vascula media) which arc outwards once they reach the shell margin.

== Subgroups ==
- Family Cryptotretidae Pelman, 1979 (lower Cambrian)
  - Aldanotreta Pelman, 1977 ("Tommotian")
  - Askepasma Laurie, 1896 ("Atdabanian")
  - Cryptotreta Pelman, 1977 ("Tommotian")
  - Dzunarzina Ushatinskaya, 1993 ("Atdabanian")
  - Salanygolina Ushatinskaya, 1987 ("Botomian")
- Family Paterinidae Schuchert, 1893 (lower Cambrian – Upper Ordovician)
  - Dictyonina Cooper, 1942 (Cambrian)
  - Dictyonites Cooper, 1956 (Ordovician)
  - Kolihium Havlicek, 1982 (Lower Ordovician)
  - Lacunites Gorjansky, 1969 (Lower Ordovician)
  - Micromitra Meek, 1873 (Cambrian)
  - Olenekina Ushatinskaya, 1997 (upper Middle Cambrian)
  - Paterina Beecher, 1891 (lower-mid Cambrian)
  - Wynnia? Walcott, 1908 (lower Cambrian)

== See also ==
- Paleozoic brachiopods
- Tumulduria
