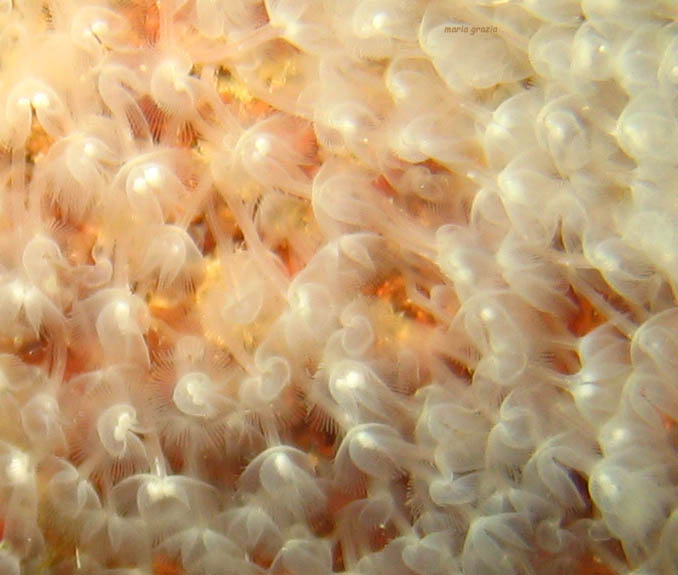
- A colony of the phoronid Phoronis hippocrepis in shallow water on the coast of Italy.

Scientific classification
- Domain: Eukaryota
- Kingdom: Animalia
- Subkingdom: Eumetazoa
- Clade: ParaHoxozoa
- Clade: Bilateria
- Clade: Nephrozoa
- Clade: Protostomia
- Clade: Spiralia
- Superphylum: Lophotrochozoa
- Clade: Lophophorata
- Clade: Brachiozoa; Cavalier-Smith 1998

Phyla
- Brachiopoda; Phoronida

Synonyms
- Phoronozoa Zrzavý et al., 1998

= Brachiozoa =

Brachiozoa Temporal range: 538.8–0 Ma

Clade of animals

Brachiozoa is a grouping of lophophorate animals including Brachiopoda and Phoronida.
