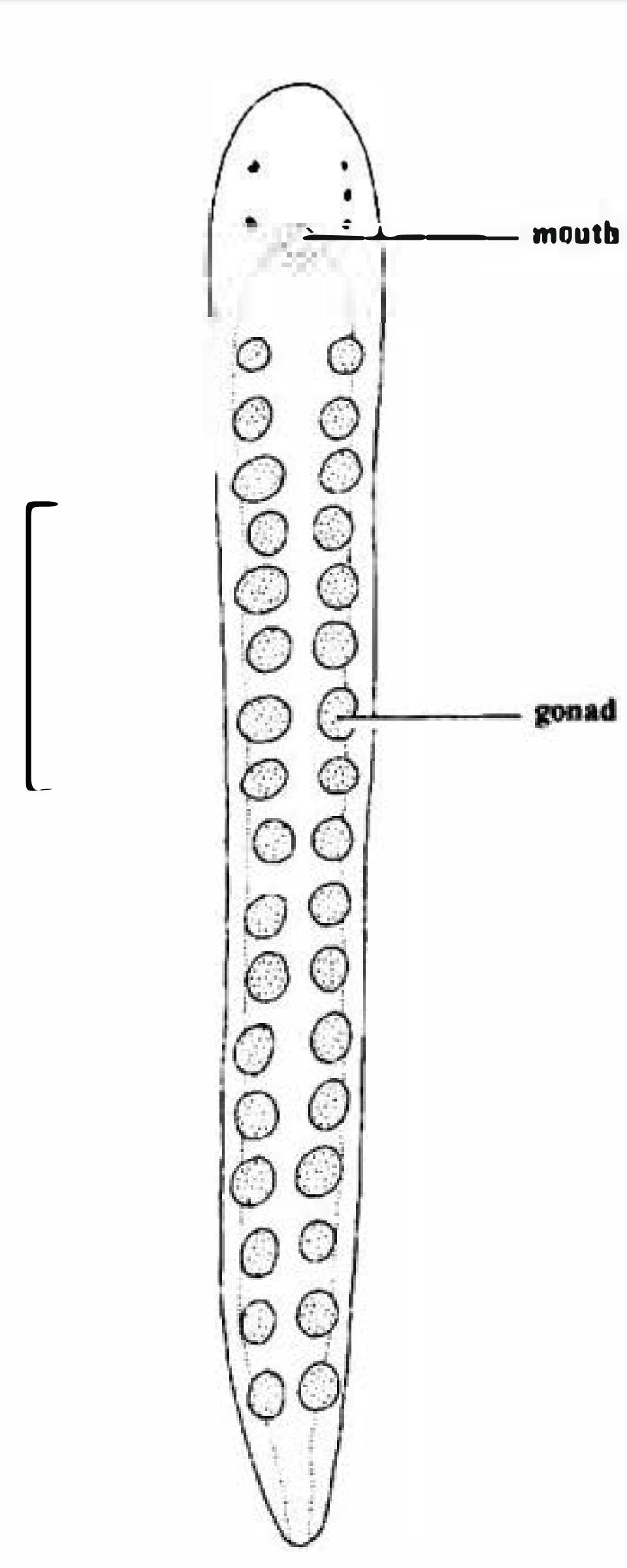
- Scale bar = 1 mm

Scientific classification
- Kingdom: Animalia
- Phylum: Nemertea
- Class: incertae sedis
- Order: Arhynchonemertea; Chernyshev, 1995
- Family: Arhynchonemertidae; Chernyshev, 1995
- Genus: Arhynchonemertes; Riser, 1988
- Species: A. axi

Binomial name
- Arhynchonemertes axi Riser, 1988
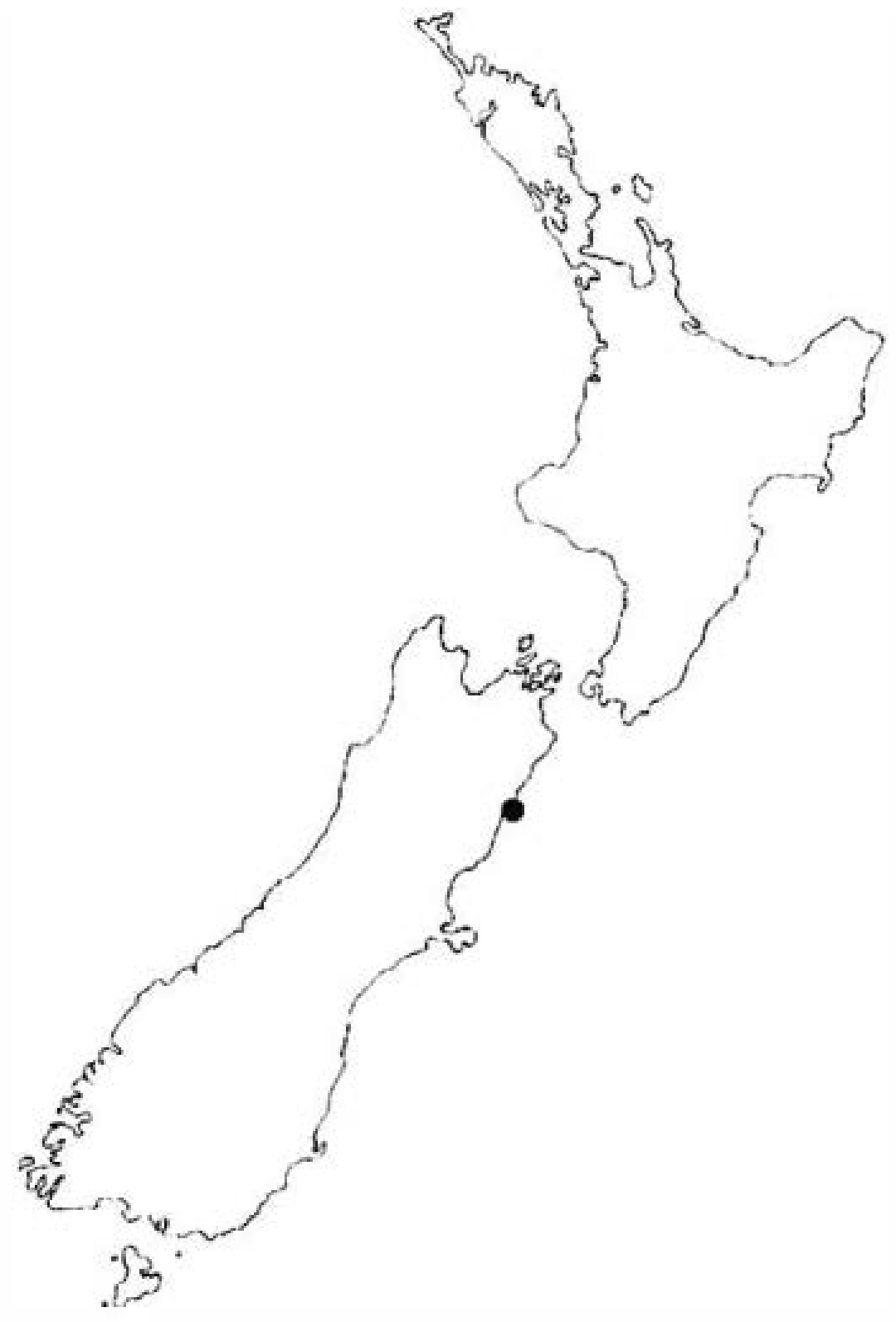
- Recorded distribution of Arhynchonemertes axi in New Zealand

= Arhynchonemertes =

Genus of nemertean worms

Arhynchonemertes axi is a species of marine nemertean of uncertain placement. It is the only ribbon worm without a rhynchocoel or proboscis. Original specimens were found in the holdfasts of Lessonia washed ashore by rough seas, in Kaikoura, South Island, New Zealand.

== Taxonomy ==
Due to the suite of primitive or aberrant traits the species has, it has been placed in many positions within Nemertea. Its order, Arhynchonemertea, family, Arhynchonemertidae, and genus have been placed as the sister group to all other nemerteans (class Rhynchocoela) in the class Arhynchocoela, without class as incertae sedis, as a possible primitive member of the Enopla, a class sometimes synonymized with Hoplonemertea.

== Biology ==
=== Description ===
The body is said to be small and hard, one purported reason for a proboscis not being required for locomotion. The animal is cigar-shaped, up to 11 mm long and 0.6 mm in diameter, colored evenly a chalk-white color, with 2 to 4 dark brown eyes in a line on each side of the anterior.

==== Internal anatomy ====
The following description is sourced from Riser N. W. 1989:

There is no proboscis apparatus, including the rhynchocoel, rhynchodaeum and the proboscis proper. A blood vascular system is present, represented by a "simple loop". The body-wall muscular system is composed of an outer circular and inner longitudinal muscle layer, both one fiber thick, as well as dorsoventral muscle fibers, which are common along the length of the animal between the mouth and posterior section. Between the muscles and the organs are three types of gland cells (mucous, homoserous and granular bacillary), each having a "neck" that independently reaches the surface of the worm. Internal in relation to it is the nervous system, with a bilobed brain that has one commissure, lacking a dorsal one. There are no cerebral organs. Under the brain is a small mouth, behind which is the dorso-lateral pore of the excretory system, which is unilateral and has a very coiled duct that opens at the start of the intestine. At the mouth opening, the epidermis and pharyngeal epithelium meet without any gradation between tissue types. After this, there is the pharynx, whose epithelium lacks any gland cells, and is composed of simple, ciliated columnar cells, and then the foregut, which is not divided morpho- or histologically into esophagus and stomach. The intestine is long and tubular, without diverticula, caeca or an evident tunica propria; the bases of its cells, between which the dorsoventral muscle fibers run, extend into the parenchyme, in which developing vitellogenic oocytes are located as well. They are produced by the ovaries, located ventrolaterally along the gut, like the testes which are dorsolateral and parallel. Both types of gonads have "preformed ducts and pores", and are found in all individuals, making the species a rare example of a hermaphroditic nemertean.

== Ecology ==
Little is directly known of its ecology, but it has been proposed that the species has a herbivorous diet, based on gut histology, the source of the species from wrack, and the lack of need for a proboscis for prey capture; and that the greatly developed dermal gland system is used for the production of a noxious or toxic secretion, making the defensive function of a proboscis redundant. It is marine, benthic, dwells in shallow waters, and is likely cryptic, having a habitat spanning beyond the holdfasts of its substrate algae, especially those of Lessonia variegata.

== Evolution ==
A. axi is a very evolutionarily relevant, although equally understudied, species of ribbon worm. Its morphology has been used as a possible indicator of primitiveness or derivedness in other ribbon worms, and as an argument against previous theories on the formation of the proboscis and vascular systems.

The two possible evolutionary origins for Arhynchonemertes are that from a reduced lineage of crown nemerteans, or as a relict from a stem-group that had not yet evolved traits such as the dorsal cerebral commissure or the proboscis complex.

Arhynchonemertes axi's diet, gland system, if defensive in origin, body form and habitat all could have led to the loss of the proboscis and the reduction of the animal, though they could equally be adaptations to survive with an ancestrally primitive body plan. The loss of the dorsal cerebral commissure could be explained if the loss of the proboscis, above which the commissure would pass, were associated with the reduction of the dorsal brain lobes, which is further indicated by the absence of the cerebral organs, which are typically innervated by those lobes. However, the proboscis system in nemerteans is innervated by the ventral lobes, and some, such as Malacobdella and Carcinonemertes, lack the cerebral organs but not the dorsal lobes, indicating the loss of the dorsal ganglia and commissure, the cerebral organs, and the proboscis are unrelated. The simplified vascular system could also be explained by the loss of the rhynchocoel, since they are connected, but the arrangement is also present in some rhynchocoelan archinemertines. Thus, the anatomy of Arhynchonemertes cannot be explained by the loss of the proboscis and its associated structures.

With the Anopla, they only share the mouth-brain association, though due to the plasticity of the precerebral region of nemerteans, this relationship can be affected, especially in species like Arhynchonemertes, since the two organs are so close. Characters, such as the visceral position of the nervous system in relation to the body-wall musculature, or the presence of submuscular gland cells, are shared with the Enopla, although the latter are of only one type, and grouped into bundles that share a discharging pore in enoplans.

Therefore, if Arhynchonemertes axi is a relict nemertean, some characteristics, like the vascular system, must have arisen before the proboscis, as they are present in A. axi, while others, like the cerebral organs, must have developed later, since they are absent in this species and other primitive nemerteans.
