= Emplectonema kandai =

Scientific classification
- Domain: Eukaryota
- Kingdom: Animalia
- Phylum: Nemertea
- Class: Hoplonemertea
- Order: Monostilifera
- Family: Emplectonematidae
- Genus: Emplectonema
- Species: E. kandai

Binomial name
- Emplectonema kandai Kato, 1939

Species of ribbon worm

Emplectonema kandai is a marine ribbon worm, found in the Aomori Bay at a depth of 35–40 meters, and coiled up on Chelyosoma sea squirts. They are reddish orange in color. They have many eyes. They vary in length, from 53–115 cm, and are about 0.5-0.7 mm in diameter, when they are stretched. It is the only currently known bioluminescent member of the genus Emplectonema, and furthermore is currently the only known bioluminescent ribbon worm. E. kandai flash brilliantly in an internal (non-secreted) luminescence, but only on stimulation. The stimulus may be mechanical, chemical, thermal or electrical. The color of their luminescence is whitish-green.
