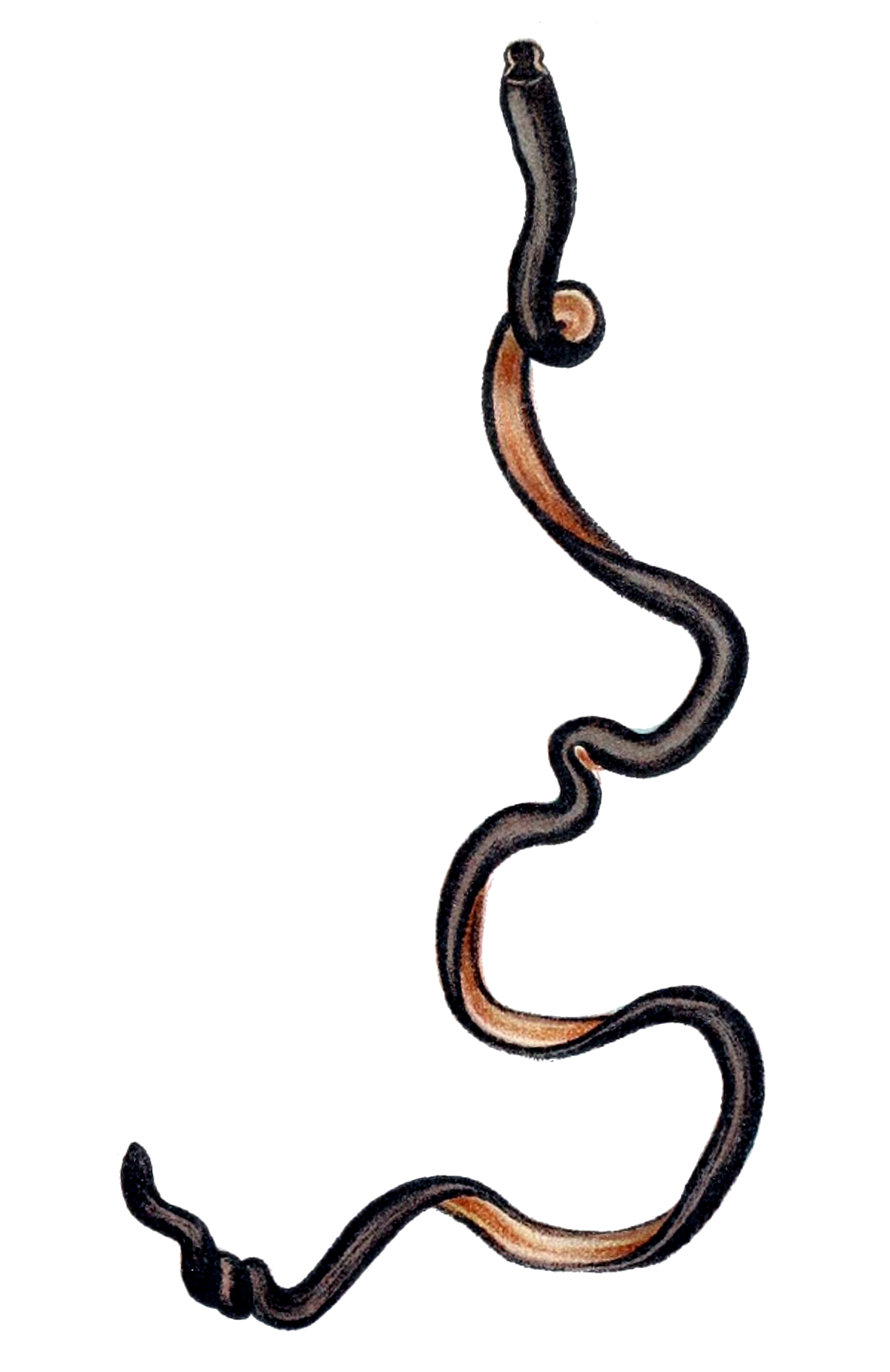

Scientific classification
- Kingdom: Animalia
- Phylum: Nemertea
- Class: Hoplonemertea
- Order: Monostilifera
- Family: Neesiidae
- Genus: Paranemertes
- Species: P. peregrina

Binomial name
- Paranemertes peregrina Coe, 1901

Synonyms
- Paranemertes cylindracae; Paranemertes cylindracea Korotkevich, 1977; Paranemertes peregrina var. alaskensis; Paranemertes peregrina var. californiensis

= Paranemertes peregrina =

Species of ribbon worm

Paranemertes peregrina is a species of Nemertea, or ribbon worm, in the family Neesiidae.

== Description ==
P. peregrina is usually dark dorsally, with a brown or purple coloration. It appears peach-colored due to its lighter ventral coloration. Their distinctive external features and spiral-shaped stylets make them easily recognizable. These stylets feature spirally wrapped grooves on their shafts that grow within vacuoles.

They, like annelids and mollusks, have spiral cleavage and trochophore larvae. In its developmental stage, P. peregrina progresses from swimming to crawling in around ten days. Nemerteans often have an Anoplan or Enoplan morphology, with P. peregrina having an Enoplan morphology.

== Distribution ==
They are observed in the Pacific Ocean from the Aleutian Islands to Ensenada, Baja California. This species can be found in intertidal habitats characterized by both muddy and rocky bays.

== Ecology ==
The species feeds exclusively on live or dead polychaetes. Digestion occurs both within and outside of cells. Food is broken down in an acidic environment by specific cells using enzymes such as peptidases, carbohydrates, and lipases. After the meal has been partially digested, it is taken by cells and thoroughly broken down with more enzymes, causing the pH to shift from acidic to alkaline.

The worm's movements across intertidal flats in search of prey inspired the specific name "peregrina". The feeding process starts when its head recoils upon making contact with prey, as the species does not locate prey through distance chemoreception but rather through direct contact. It then involves the exposure of the proboscis, which wraps around the prey. This action results in the temporary paralysis or death of the prey. Finally, the prey is swallowed by sucking through the help of muscles surrounding the mouth. It subsequently releases waste within a time frame ranging from 12 to 33 hours after consuming food. The feeding process lasts for seven to eight minutes upon successful contact. Following this, P. peregrina retraces its path to the burrow, relying on the mucus trail it left behind.
