= Carcinonemertes carcinophila =

Scientific classification
- Kingdom: Animalia
- Phylum: Nemertea
- Class: Hoplonemertea
- Order: Monostilifera
- Family: Carcinonemertidae
- Genus: Carcinonemertes
- Species: C. carcinophila

Binomial name
- Carcinonemertes carcinophila (Kölliker, 1845)

Species of ribbon worm

Carcinonemertes carcinophila is a species of ribbon worm. They are very small worms that have a high tolerance of low-saline waters, unlike most other species of nemertea.

C. carcinophila specialise in eating the eggs of decapod crustaceans. Because of this, C. carcinophila is considered parasitic and can be particularly infestive to other species that live in a variety of waters, such as the Atlantic blue crab (Callinectes sapidus). In one study, an average of 53.9 worms per infested crab host were found during the blue crab's spawning season. It was also found that 71% of the worms were actively feeding on their host's laid eggs, and between 0.16–4.5 eggs were consumed per worm per day. The salinity tolerance of C. carcinophila has been researched and found to have a wide range, of 10-30 psu.

C. carcinophila may be useful as a biomarker for species of crabs, as the tiny worms "grow and change colour after feeding". This means that it may be possible to determine whether a female crab has spawned or not, which helps to monitor reproductive numbers in fisheries.

The original name used for this species is Nemertes cartinophilos, coined by Kölliker in 1845. Their distribution is discontinuous, found in North America, northwest Europe, and North-Africa.
