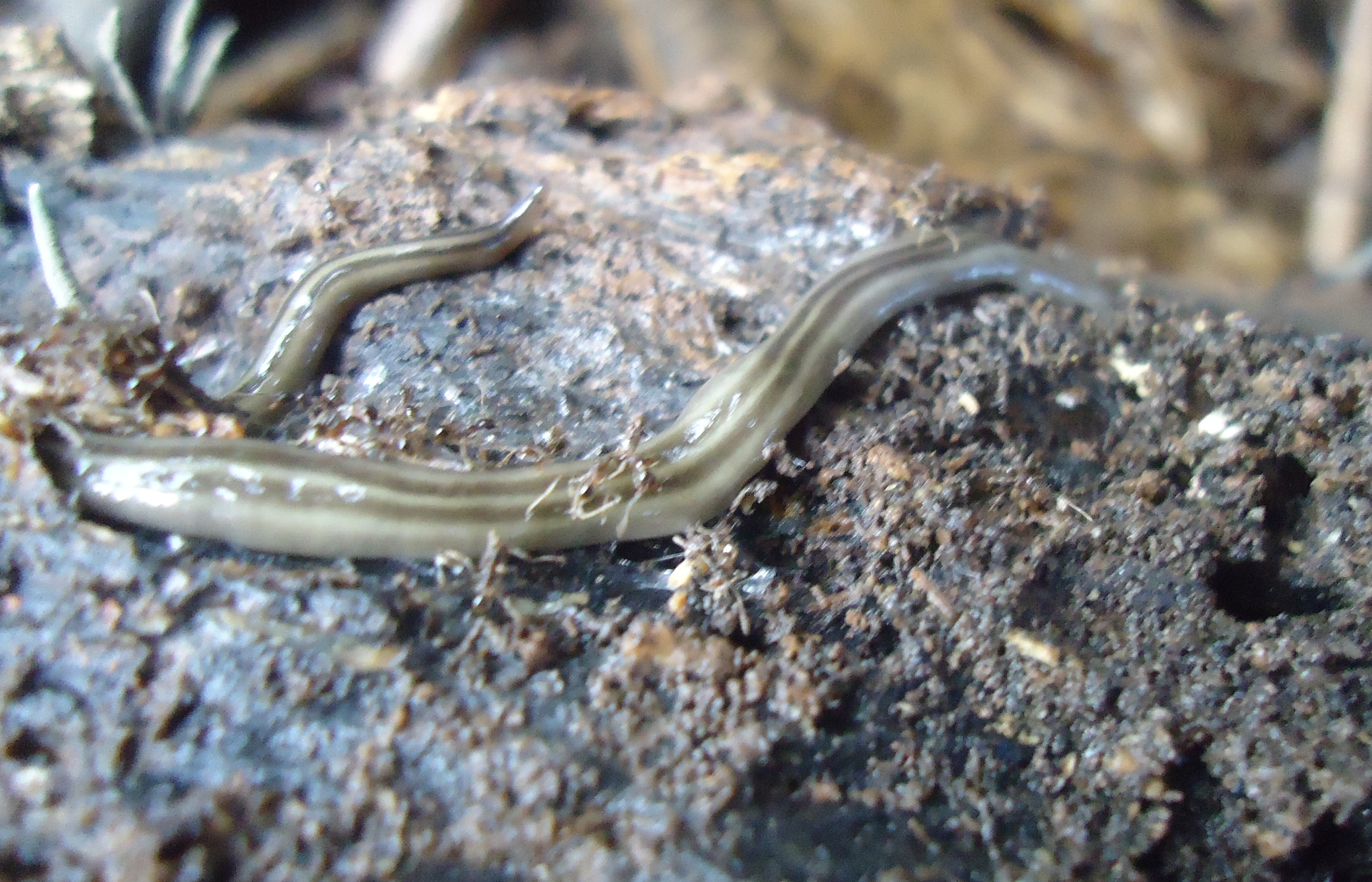
- Terrestrial nemertean Geonemertes

Scientific classification
- Kingdom: Animalia
- Phylum: Nemertea
- Class: Enopla; Schultze, 1851

Subgroups
- See text.

= Enopla =

Class of worms of the phylum Nemertea

Enopla is one of the classes of the worm phylum Nemertea, characterized by the presence of a peculiar armature of spines or plates in the proboscis.

== Evolution and systematics ==
The record of nemerteans is extremely sparse, as would be expected from a soft-bodied animal. The Cambrian fossil, Amiskwia, has been interpreted as a nemertean based on its resemblance to some pelagic ribbon worms; however, this interpretation is disputed by many paleontologists. The enoplan nemerteans have been regarded as highly derived based on a more complicated muscle arrangement in the body wall and a more complex nervous system. However, whether this is a plesiomorphic or apomorphic character is not clear, and recent molecular studies are inconclusive in this respect.

Class Enopla used to be divided in two subclasses, Hoplonemertea and Bdellonemertea, but recent phylogenetic analyses based on nucleotide sequences show that Bdellonemertea should be included in Hoplonemertea. Hoplonemertea (in the old sense) contains two suborders, Monostilifera and Polystilifera. The encompasses those animals with a proboscis armature consisting of a single central stylet on a large cylindrical basis. The Polystilifera are armed with a pad, or shield, bearing numerous small stylets. The Polystilifera are further divided in two taxa, one (Pelagica) containing the pelagic species, and the other (Reptantia) with crawling or burrowing forms.

The class is currently divided into 30 families and 155 genera with approximately 650 described species. The two largest genera, Amphiporus and Tetrastemma contain 230 species, i.e., one third of all named species in the class. However, it must be made very clear that the systematics and classification of nemerteans are not based on a phylogenetic approach, and recent studies question the classification.

== Physical characteristics ==
Enoplan nemerteans are generally small, from less than 1 centimetre (0.4 in) up to 10 centimetres (4 in), although larger species exist. While most nemerteans are rather drab in color, others are more conspicuous with striking pigment patterns and coloration. However, the more brightly colored forms are more common in the class Anopla. A nemertean is generally recognized in the field by the way it moves. Its normal movement is gliding over the surface by help of cilia on the ventral side in combination with mucus produced by the worm. Some species may, under certain circumstances, swim with undulating movements, but only for a short period of time. Enoplans are differentiated by the proboscis, which is armed (i.e., there is a stylet attached to it) in enoplans but unarmed in anoplans. Enoplans have a common opening for the proboscis and mouth, whereas anoplans have separate openings for the two structures.

== Distribution ==
Enoplan nemerteans are known from all continents and all seas. Terrestrial nemerteans are mainly known from islands in the tropical and subtropical regions, although there are few more widespread species. Freshwater species are also reported from all continents, except the Antarctic.

== Habitat ==
Enoplan nemerteans are typically found in the sea, in the littoral among algae. While larger species may be found simply by turning over boulders, smaller species are not found unless special techniques are utilized. An easy way of collecting nemerteans is to place seaweed and smaller algae in a bucket of sea water and let it stand for a few hours, and up to a couple of days, depending on weather and temperature. The worms will crawl to the sides of the bucket, where they are easily observed and collected, as the oxygen concentration decreases in the water.

Although nemerteans are abundant, especially in temperate waters, their presence is often overlooked because they are not easily observed. Enoplan nemerteans do not appear to be equally common sublittorally, but this may be a result of biased sampling (less accessible environments). The majority of enoplan ribbon worms are marine and benthic, but there are approximately 100 named and described species of pelagic nemerteans. These creatures inhabit the water column of the world oceans, commonly found at depths of between a few hundred feet and several thousand feet, and they are most abundant at 2,130 to 8,200 ft (625 to 2,500 m).

There are a few freshwater species recorded, of which most are placed in the genus Prostoma. This genus is also by far the most widespread, especially the two species, Prostoma eilhardi and Prostoma graecense. The latter has been recorded from Europe, Africa, Japan, and Australia. The spreading of these animals is probably a result of the exportation and importation of freshwater vegetation.

There are 13 known species of terrestrial nemerteans; a typical feature of these species is that their distribution tends to be restricted to a particular island. These species live in damp places under stones and in rotting wood.

== Behavior ==
Most nemerteans are solitary, free-living animals.

== Feeding ecology and diet ==
Nemerteans are common predators in a variety of habitats. Benthic marine enoplans are suctorial feeders and prey mainly on crustaceans. The proboscis is everted and the central armature (the stylet) is used to pierce and immobilize the prey. After inversion of the proboscis, the worm uses its head to probe among the crustacean appendages, seeking a place where it can penetrate the prey; eventually, the head is wedged past the opening and the anterior gut is everted into the opening. It is uncertain whether proteolytic enzymes are inserted through the stylet-produced hole in the exoskeleton—histology of central armature suggests this — but at some stage, enzymes are injected to dissolve the prey's body tissue. Free-living marine suctorial nemerteans appear to be food specialists feeding primarily on amphipods. There are some enoplan species known to feed upon barnacles, limpets, and polychaetes. There are also examples of macrophagus hoplonemerteans that engulf the entire prey after paralyzing it with a blow by the stylet. Freshwater hoplonemerteans are known to feed on oligochaetes, unicellular organisms, insect larvae, and other crustaceans. Very little is known about the ecology of pelagic nemerteans, including diet and feeding behavior.

There is one group of parasitic enoplan nemerteans (family Carcinonemertidae) found among the egg masses of certain crab species that feed on the host's embryos. There are also commensal enoplans (in family Bdellonemertidae) that live in the mantle cavities of bivalves where they feed on plankton from the mantle cavity. Obviously, the proboscis is not used to capture prey and has been (perhaps secondarily) reduced in these species.

== Reproductive biology ==
Most nemerteans are dioecious, although there are a few hermaphroditic hoplonemerteans. Most species are oviparous, i.e., produce eggs that are laid and hatched externally. Mode of spawning is unknown for most species, but where known, it ranges from widespread release of gametes into surrounding waters, to pseudocopulation with eggs attached in a gelatinous matrix to a benthic substratum. A few species bear living young.

== Conservation status ==
Very little is known about nemertean ecology, distribution, or abundance. It is clear, however, that certain species are the most abundant invertebrate group in some habitats/localities. Whether other species are threatened is almost impossible to say, but the 1996 IUCN Red List of Threatened Species includes six terrestrial nemerteans. Two species (Antiponemertes allisonae and Katechonemertes nightingaleensis) are considered Threatened, and Argonemertes hillii as Near Threatened.

== Significance to humans ==
There is very little direct significance of nemertean worms to humans. Some species in the family Carcinonemertidae are egg parasites of commercially important species of crustaceans, but the overall economic effect of nemertean parasites is small. Also, many nemerteans produce toxins of which some are nicotinic agonists. Some of these toxins, originally found in a nemertean, have been synthesized and tested in pre-clinical trials as a possible memory enhancer in the treatment of Alzheimer's disease.
