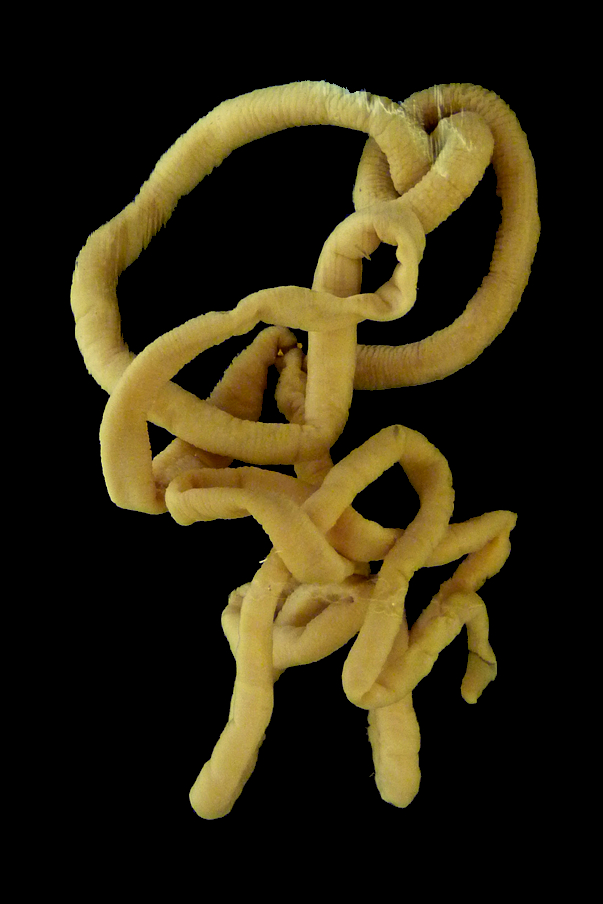

Scientific classification
- Kingdom: Animalia
- Phylum: Nemertea
- Class: Pilidiophora
- Order: Heteronemertea
- Family: Lineidae
- Genus: Lineus
- Species: L. longissimus

Binomial name
- Lineus longissimus (Gunnerus, 1770)

Synonyms
- Nemertes borlasii Cuvier, 1817

= Lineus longissimus =

Bootlace worm

Species of ribbon worm

The bootlace worm (Lineus longissimus) is a species of ribbon worm and one of the longest known animals, with specimens typically measuring 5–15 m (16–49 ft), and individuals known to measure up to 30 m (98 ft) long. There exist reports claiming lengths of up to 55 m (180 ft), although it is possible that these are reporting individuals that have been stretched beyond their usual length. Its mucus is highly toxic.

== Taxonomy ==
The bootlace worm is in the phylum Nemertea or ribbon worms. It is the most common nemertean found along the coasts of Britain.

== Description ==
Bootlace worms may grow very long but are usually only 5 to 10 millimetres (0.20 to 0.39 in) in width. The body is brown with lighter (longitudinal) stripes. Its mucus contains a relatively strong neurotoxin which it uses as a defense against predators. When handled, it produces large amounts of thick mucus with a faint pungent smell, reminiscent of iron or sewage. This toxic mucus has been shown to kill crabs and cockroaches, and could have applications as an agricultural insecticide. Tests on this toxin have shown low toxicity in human cells, as well as low bactericidal and bacteriostatic properties.

In 1864, William M'Intosh described a specimen that had washed ashore in the aftermath of a severe storm by St Andrews, Scotland, which was more than 55 m (180 ft) long, longer than the longest known lion's mane jellyfish, the animal which is often considered to be the longest in the world. However, records of extreme length should be taken with caution, because the bodies of nemerteans are flexible and can easily stretch to much more than their usual length.

Like other nemerteans, Lineus longissimus feeds using its eversible proboscis. As it is in the class Anopla, its proboscis is not armed with a barbed stylet. Instead, it has a cluster of sticky filaments at the end of its proboscis that it uses to immobilize prey.

== Habitat ==
Lineus longissimus can be found on Norway's and Britain's coasts, on the Danish east coast and also on Sweden's west coast, Perhaps except eastern Scotland and England, Ranging from Iceland eastwards to the Atlantic, North Sea and the Baltic Coasts of Europe.
