= Carcinonemertes errans =

Scientific classification
- Kingdom: Animalia
- Phylum: Nemertea
- Class: Hoplonemertea
- Order: Monostilifera
- Family: Carcinonemertidae
- Genus: Carcinonemertes
- Species: C. errans

Binomial name
- Carcinonemertes errans Wickham, 1978

Species of ribbon worm

Carcinonemertes errans is a ribbon worm in the family Carcinonemertidae. It lives in symbiosis with the Dungeness crab (Metacarcinus magister), consuming the crab's developing eggs. In 1980 it was implicated in the collapse of the Dungeness crab fishery in central California.

== Ecology ==
The planktonic larva of the worm settles on a suitable crab host and encysts on the exoskeleton. Carcinonemertes errans is the first species in its genus to be found on a single host species. The worm has a permanent symbiotic relationship with its host crab but it is not a parasite as it does not feed directly on the crab but is instead an egg-predator. In male crabs, and in non-breeding female crabs, the worm may live in the axils of the limbs and encyst. After mating, the mature female crab stores the sperm for several months, before releasing a batch of fertilised eggs onto her abdomen, where she tucks them under the tail flap. At this stage, the ribbon worm migrates to the mass of eggs and feeds on the developing embryos.

If the worm larvae happen to settle on the exoskeleton of a brooding female crab, they can move immediately to the underside of the abdominal flap and metamorphose within 48 hours into juvenile worms. When settling, the larvae are gregarious, settling preferentially on already infected crabs. It has been found that the worm is adversely affected by a lowering of the water salinity. Crabs in estuaries show an estuarine gradient, with crabs nearest the ocean carrying more worms than those further upstream.

== Effect on the Dungeness crab industry ==
The Dungeness crab industry is an important fishery on the Pacific coast, with 53 million pounds (24 million kilograms) worth $170 million being harvested in 2014. In 1980, the central California fishery was badly affected; Carcinonemertes errans was implicated, with 50% of the crabs' eggs produced each year being predated.
