= Hubrechtia =

Scientific classification
- Kingdom: Animalia
- Phylum: Nemertea
- Class: Pilidiophora
- Order: Hubrechtiiformes
- Family: Hubrechtiidae
- Genus: Hubrechtia; Bürger, 1892
- Species: H. desiderata

Binomial name
- Hubrechtia desiderata (Kennel, 1891)

Genus of worms

Hubrechtia is a monotypic genus of worms belonging to the family Hubrechtiidae. The only species is Hubrechtia desiderata.

The species inhabits marine environments.
