= Ovicides =

Scientific classification
- Kingdom: Animalia
- Phylum: Nemertea
- Class: Hoplonemertea
- Order: Monostilifera
- Family: Carcinonemertidae
- Genus: Ovicides; Shields, 2001

Genus of ribbon worms

Ovicides is a genus of worms belonging to the family Carcinonemertidae.

The species of this genus are found in Pacific Ocean.

Species:

- Ovicides davidi Shields & Segonzac, 2007
- Ovicides jasoni Shields & Segonzac, 2007
- Ovicides jonesi Shields & Segonzac, 2007
- Ovicides julieae Shields, 2001
- Ovicides paralithodis Kajihara & Kuris, 2013
