= Aomori Bay =

Bay in Japan

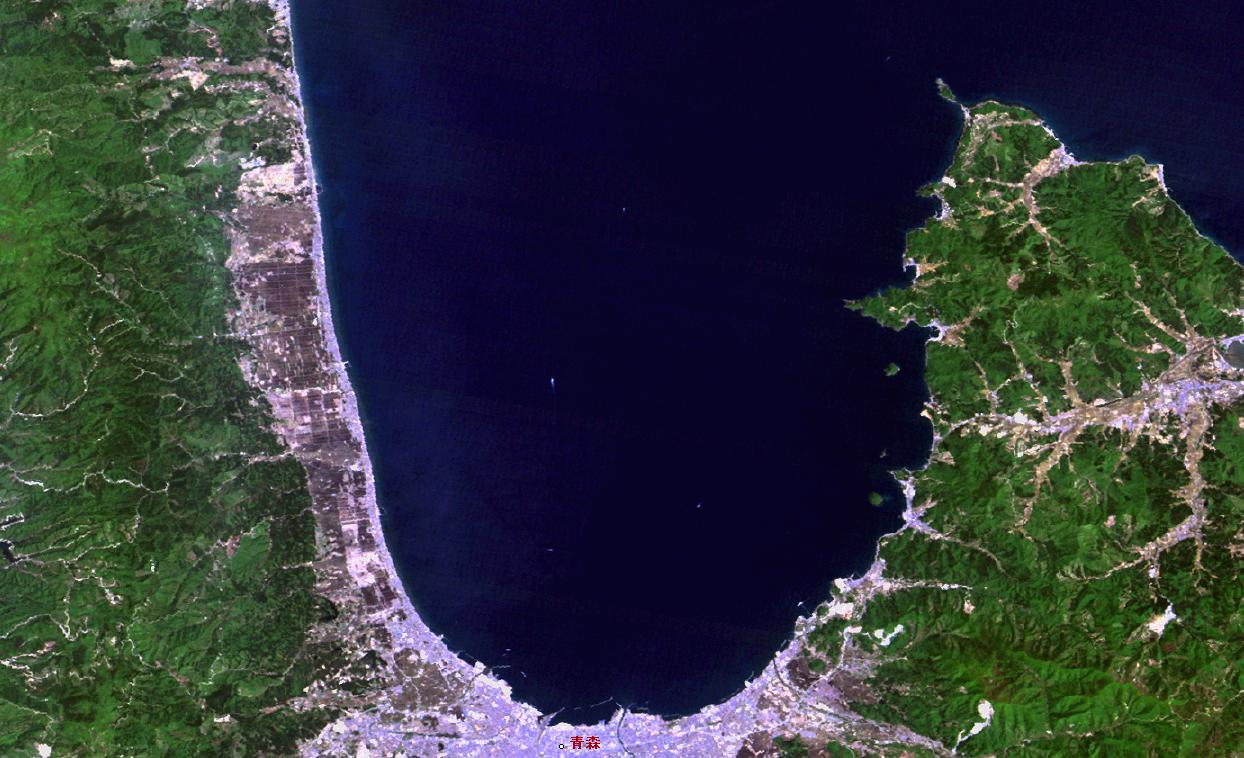
- Landsat image of Aomori Bay

- Location within Aomori Prefecture Location within Japan
- Location: Aomori Prefecture, Japan
- Coordinates: 40°55′N 140°45′E
- Ocean/sea sources: Pacific Ocean
- Basin countries: Japan
- Average depth: 40 m (130 ft)
- Settlements: Aomori, Hiranai, Yomogita

The Aomori Bay (青森湾, Aomori-wan) is a bay located north of the island of Honshu, in Japan. It is considered to be part of the larger Mutsu Bay.

== Geography ==
Aomori Bay is an inner bay located to the west of Natsudomari Peninsula that protrudes in the center of the southern coast of Mutsu Bay. The bay is bordered by the Tsugaru Peninsula to the west and the harbor of Aomori to the south.

== Animal and plant life ==
Emplectonema kandai is a bioluminescent marine ribbon worm found in Aomori Bay at a depth of 35–40 meters, and coiled up on Chelyosoma sea squirts.

== Human history ==
The bay provided resources for the Jōmon people living at the settlements along its coastline, such as the Sannai-Maruyama Site.

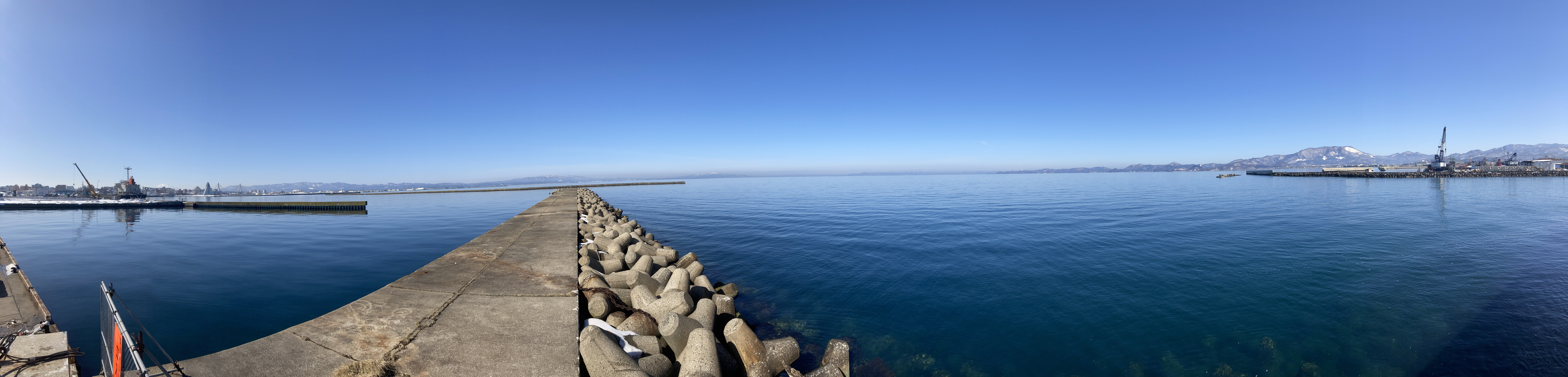
Panorama of Aomori Bay as it is seen from the mouth of the Tsutsumi River with central Aomori to the far-left, Tsugaru Peninsula at center-left, and Natsudomari Peninsula to the right.
