= Nemertopsis =

Scientific classification
- Kingdom: Animalia
- Phylum: Nemertea
- Class: Hoplonemertea
- Order: Monostilifera
- Family: Emplectonematidae
- Genus: Nemertopsis; Bürger, 1895

Genus of ribbon worms

Nemertopsis is a genus of worms belonging to the family Emplectonematidae.

The genus has cosmopolitan distribution.

Species:

- Nemertopsis bivittata (Delle Chiaje, 1841)
- Nemertopsis bullocki Coe, 1940
- Nemertopsis capitulata Timofeeva, 1912
- Nemertopsis exilis Coe, 1947
- Nemertopsis flavida (McIntosh, 1873/74)
- Nemertopsis gracilis Coe, 1904
- Nemertopsis mitellicola Kajihara, 2007
- Nemertopsis quadripunctata (Quoy & Gaimard, 1833)
- Nemertopsis tenuis Beaumont, 1900
- Nemertopsis tenuis Bürger, 1895
- Nemertopsis tetraclitophila Gibson, 1990
