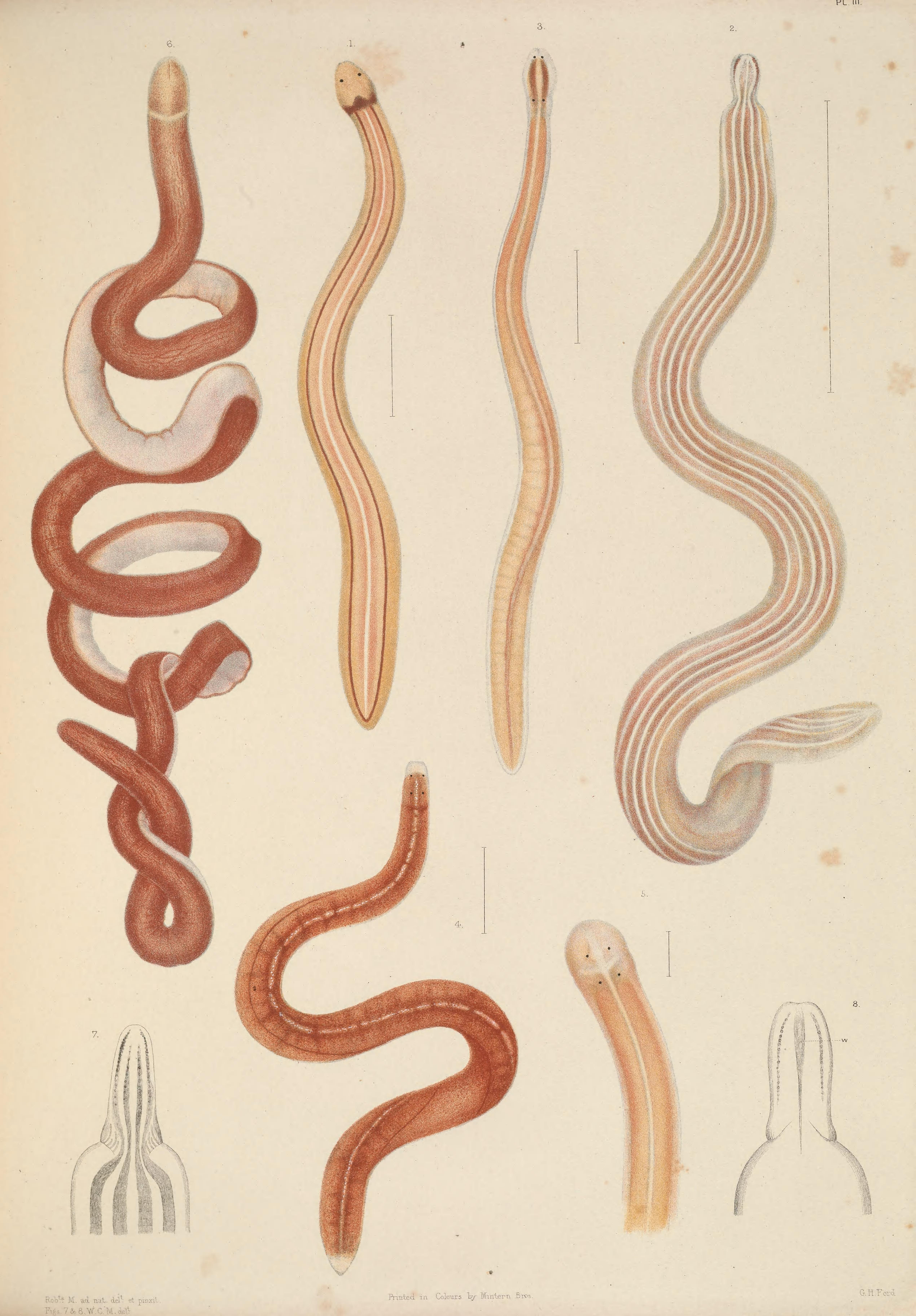
- Emplectonema neesii figure 6

Scientific classification
- Kingdom: Animalia
- Phylum: Nemertea
- Class: Hoplonemertea
- Order: Monostilifera
- Family: Emplectonematidae
- Genus: Emplectonema
- Species: E. neesii

Binomial name
- Emplectonema neesii Örsted, 1843

Synonyms
- Amphiporus neesii; Borlasia camillea; Empectonema neesix; Emplectoneema neesi; Emplectonema camillea; Emplectonema neesi; Eunemertes neesi; Eunemertes neesii; Gordius fuscus; Neesia neesii; Nemertes camillea

= Emplectonema neesii =

Species of ribbon worm

Emplectonema neesii is a species of ribbon worm in the phylum Nemertea. It is found on the middle and lower regions of the shore, under stones and in shingle and is common round the coasts of Britain and Ireland.

== Description ==
Like other ribbon worms, this species is not divided into segments but is long, thin and contractile. It is usually ten to fifteen centimetres long but can extend to thirty centimetres. The head is bluntly pointed and has a slit at the front. It bears many eyes, usually in two groups, but these are hard to see because of the worm's colouring and texture. There is an extensible proboscis above the mouth. The head is delineated by a pale streak where it joins the body. The dorsal surface of the body is rounded and brown with longitudinal streaks and a faint iridescence. The ventral surface is off white and flattened.

== Distribution and habitat ==
Emplectonema neesii is restricted to the Atlantic, Irish Sea and North Sea coasts of Europe. It occurs from Iceland to the Mediterranean Sea. It is found in the littoral zone and at a depth of up to thirty metres. It is usually beneath stones and boulders, in rock crevices and fissures, among the holdfasts of Laminaria, among the byssus threads of Mytilus colonies or on a variety of soft substrates including sand, silty-sand, shelly-gravel and shingle.

== Biology ==
When disturbed, this worm tends to curl up, writhe and wriggle. Movement is performed by small waves of muscular contraction that flow along the body from tail to head. Several waves may occur simultaneously and the worm glides forward slowly and smoothly, the swellings running evenly along the body. It is carnivorous, being both a predator and a scavenger.
