= Paranemertes =

Scientific classification
- Kingdom: Animalia
- Phylum: Nemertea
- Class: Hoplonemertea
- Order: Monostilifera
- Family: Neesiidae
- Genus: Paranemertes; Coe, 1901

Genus of ribbon worms

Paranemertes is a genus of worms belonging to the family Neesiidae.

The species of this genus are found in Northern Pacific Ocean.

Species:

- Paranemertes brattstroemi Friedrich, 1970
- Paranemertes californica Coe, 1904
- Paranemertes carnea Coe, 1901
- Paranemertes cornea
- Paranemertes incola Iwata, 1952
- Paranemertes katoi Yamaoka, 1947
- Paranemertes neesii (Ørsted, 1843)
- Paranemertes pallida Coe, 1901
- Paranemertes peregrina Coe, 1901
- Paranemertes plana Iwata, 1957
- Paranemertes sanjuanensis Stricker, 1982
