= Prostoma jenningsi =

Scientific classification
- Kingdom: Animalia
- Phylum: Nemertea
- Class: Hoplonemertea
- Order: Monostilifera
- Family: Prostomatidae
- Genus: Prostoma
- Species: P. jenningsi

Binomial name
- Prostoma jenningsi Gibson & Young, 1971

Species of ribbon worm

Prostoma jenningsi is a species of ribbon worm known only from one site near Croston, Lancashire. It was described in 1971, and is believed to be the county's only endemic species. It grows up to 20 mm (0.8 in) long, with 4–6 black eyespots, and has a long eversible proboscis.

== Distribution ==
The only site where P. jenningsi has been found is a former clay pit now used for recreational fishing between Bretherton and Croston in Chorley borough, Lancashire. It was discovered there in 1967, and described by Ray Gibson and Johnstone O. Young in 1971. It is thought to be the only species endemic to Lancashire.

Prior to the discovery of P. jenningsi, there had only been four reports of freshwater nemerteans in the British Isles, in the River Cherwell at Oxford, the River Cam at Cambridge, a tank in Regent's Park, London, and the Grand Canal at Clondalkin, County Dublin.

== Description ==
Prostoma jenningsi is a slender worm, with an elliptical cross-section. When young they are translucently white but take on a yellowish hue as they age, they then become a "dark yellowish or pale reddish-brown" as they age. They are 0.5 millimetres (0.020 in) long when they hatch, reach their adult colouration above 6 mm (0.24 in) and can reach up to 20 millimetres (0.8 in) long as adults. P. jenningsi has 4–6 black eyespots on the top of the head, The eversible proboscis is two-thirds to three-quarters of the body length, and is armed with one central stylet and paired pouches each containing 2–5 accessory stylets.

P. jenningsi is one of eleven species in the genus Prostoma, and can only be told from related species by dissection. Uniquely, it has eleven nerves innervating the proboscis, rather than nine or ten, as seen in other species. The specific epithet jenningsi commemorates J. B. Jennings of the University of Leeds, a scientist who studied invertebrate digestive physiology. No taxonomic synonyms are recognised.

== Ecology ==
Prostoma jenningsi lives among the vegetation at the edges of the pond, including plant species Juncus effusus, Elodea canadensis, Myriophyllum spicatum, Phragmites communis, Potamogeton natans and Typha latifolia. Its numbers vary in an annual cycle, with smallest numbers when vegetation growth is highest.
