= Carcinonemertes =

Scientific classification
- Kingdom: Animalia
- Phylum: Nemertea
- Class: Hoplonemertea
- Order: Monostilifera
- Family: Carcinonemertidae
- Genus: Carcinonemertes; Coe, 1902

Genus of ribbon worms

Carcinonemertes is a genus of nemerteans belonging to the family Carcinonemertidae.

The genus has almost cosmopolitan distribution.

== Species ==
Species:

- Carcinonemertes australiensis Campbell, Gibson & Evans, 1989
- Carcinonemertes caissarum Santos, Norenburg & Bueno, 2006
- Carcinonemertes carcinophila Kölliker, 1845
- Carcinonemertes coei Humes, 1942
- Carcinonemertes conanobrieni Simpson, Ambrosio & Baeza, 2017
- Carcinonemertes divae Santos, Noremberg & Bueno, 2006
- Carcinonemertes epialti Coe, 1902
- Carcinonemertes errans Wickham, 1978
