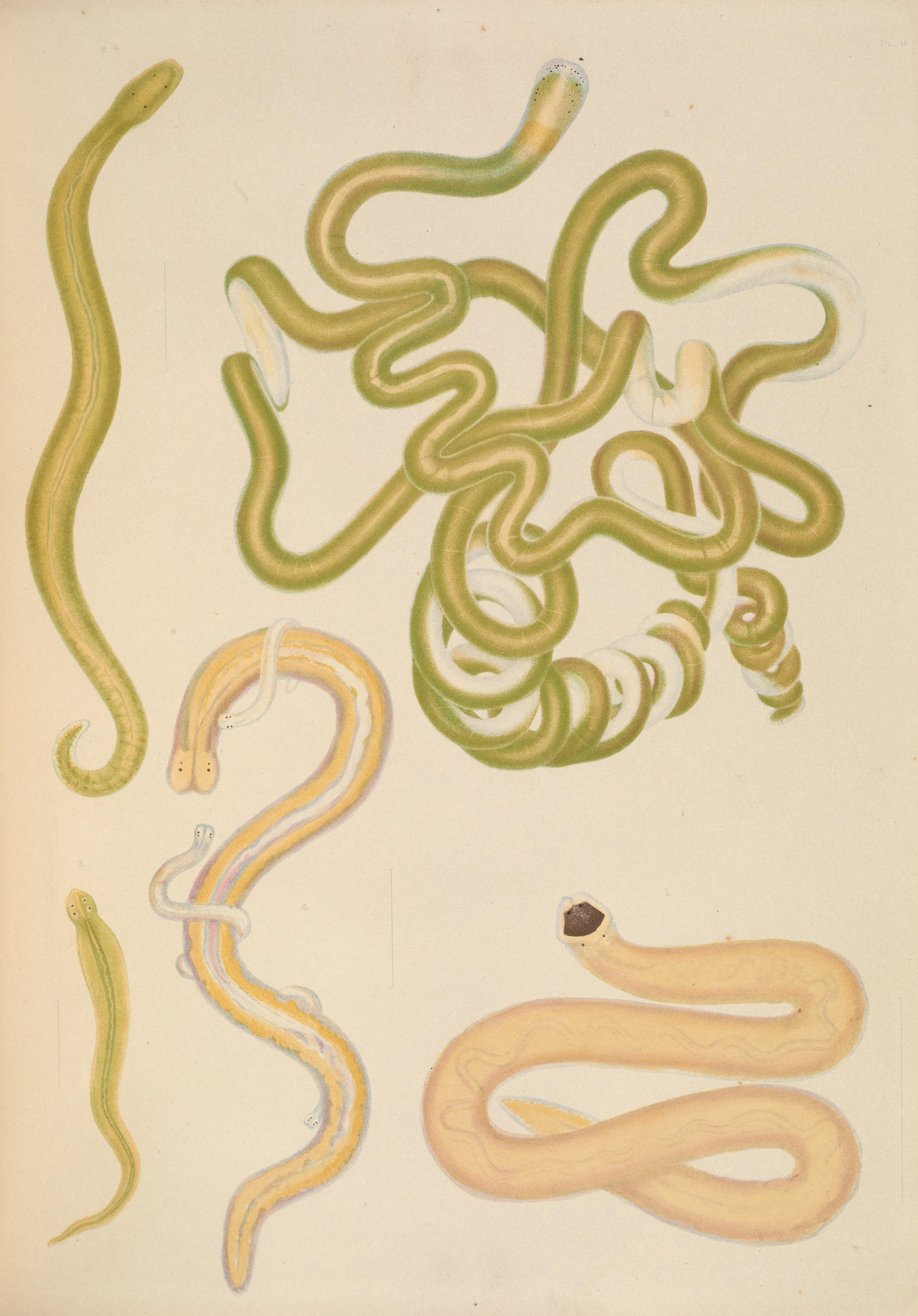
- A monograph of the British marine annelids.

Scientific classification
- Kingdom: Animalia
- Phylum: Nemertea
- Class: Hoplonemertea
- Order: Monostilifera
- Infraorder: Amphiporina
- Family: Emplectonematidae

= Emplectonematidae =

Family of ribbon worms

Emplectonematidae is a family of worms belonging to the order Hoplonemertea.

== Genera ==
Genera:

- Atyponemertes Friedrich, 1938
- Atyponemertes Friedrich, 1938
- Crybelonemertes Sundberg & Gibson, 1995
- Cryptonemertes Gibson, 1986
- Emplectonema Stimpson, 1857
- Halimanemertes Gibson, 1990
- Ischyronemertes Gibson, 1990
- Nemertes Johnston, 1837
- Nemertopsella Wheeler, 1940
- Nemertopsis Bürger, 1895
- Poikilonemertes Stiasny-Wijnhoff, 1942
- Sanjuannemertes Iwata, 2006
- Satellitenemertes Iwata, 2006
- Tetranemertes Tshernyshev, 1992
- Thermanemertes Rogers, Gibson & Tunnicliffe, 1996
