= Emplectonema =

Scientific classification
- Domain: Eukaryota
- Kingdom: Animalia
- Phylum: Nemertea
- Class: Hoplonemertea
- Order: Monostilifera
- Family: Emplectonematidae
- Genus: Emplectonema; Stimpson, 1857

Genus of ribbon worms

Emplectonema is a genus of worms belonging to the family Emplectonematidae.

The species of this genus are found in Europe, Southern Asia and Northern America.

Species:

- Emplectonema bocki Brunberg, 1957
- Emplectonema bonhourei (Joubin, 1904)
- Emplectonema buergeri Coe, 1901
- Emplectonema neesii Örsted, 1843
