= Tetranemertes =

Scientific classification
- Kingdom: Animalia
- Phylum: Nemertea
- Class: Hoplonemertea
- Order: Monostilifera
- Family: Poseidonemertidae
- Genus: Tetranemertes; Chernyshev, 1992

Genus of ribbon worms

Tetranemertes is a genus of worms belonging to the family Poseidonemertidae.

The genus has almost cosmopolitan distribution.

Species:

- Tetranemertes antonina (Quatrefages, 1846)
- Tetranemertes hermaphroditicus (Gibson, 1982)
- Tetranemertes rubrolineata (Kirsteuer, 1965)
