= Hubrechtiidae =

Scientific classification
- Domain: Eukaryota
- Kingdom: Animalia
- Phylum: Nemertea
- Class: Pilidiophora
- Order: Hubrechtiiformes
- Family: Hubrechtiidae; Bürger, 1892

Genera
- Hubrechtia Bürger, 1892; Sundbergia Gibson, 2002; Tetramys Iwata, 1957

Synonyms
- Hubrechtidae Wijnhoff, 1913?

Family of worms

Hubrechtiidae is a family of worms belonging to the order Hubrechtiiformes.
