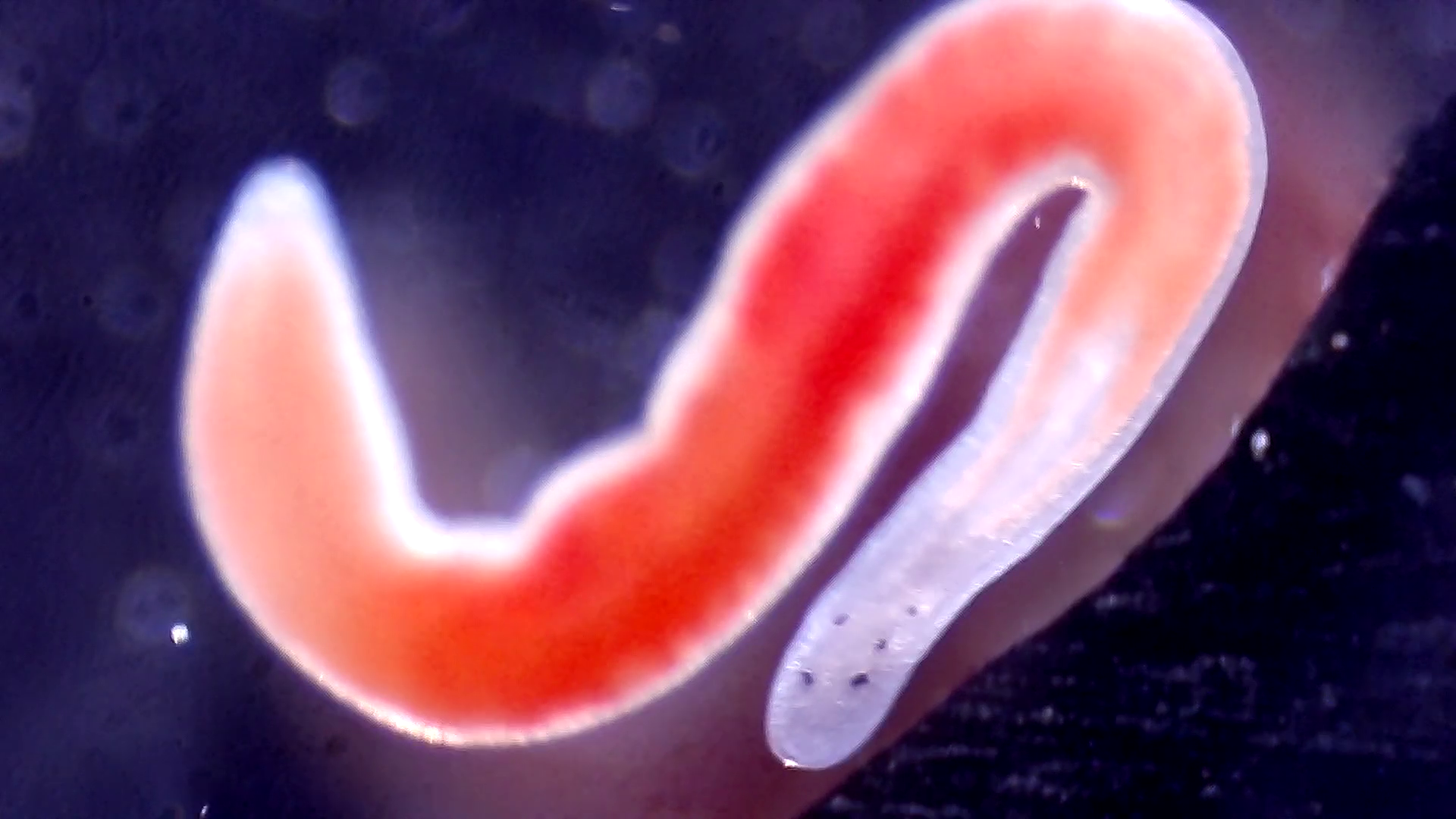

Scientific classification
- Kingdom: Animalia
- Phylum: Nemertea
- Class: Hoplonemertea
- Order: Monostilifera
- Family: Prostomatidae
- Genus: Prostoma; Dugès, 1828

= Prostoma =

Genus of ribbon worms

Prostoma is a genus of freshwater nemerteans, containing the following species:

- Prostoma asensoriatum Montgomery, 1896
- Prostoma canadiensis Gibson & Moore, 1978
- Prostoma communopore Senz, 1996
- Prostoma eilhardi (Montgomery, 1894)
- Prostoma graecense (Böhmig, 1892)
- Prostoma hercegovinense Tarman, 1961
- Prostoma jenningsi Gibson & Young, 1971
- Prostoma kolasai Gibson & Moore, 1976
- Prostoma ohmiense Chernyshev et al., 1998
- Prostoma puteale Beauchamp, 1932

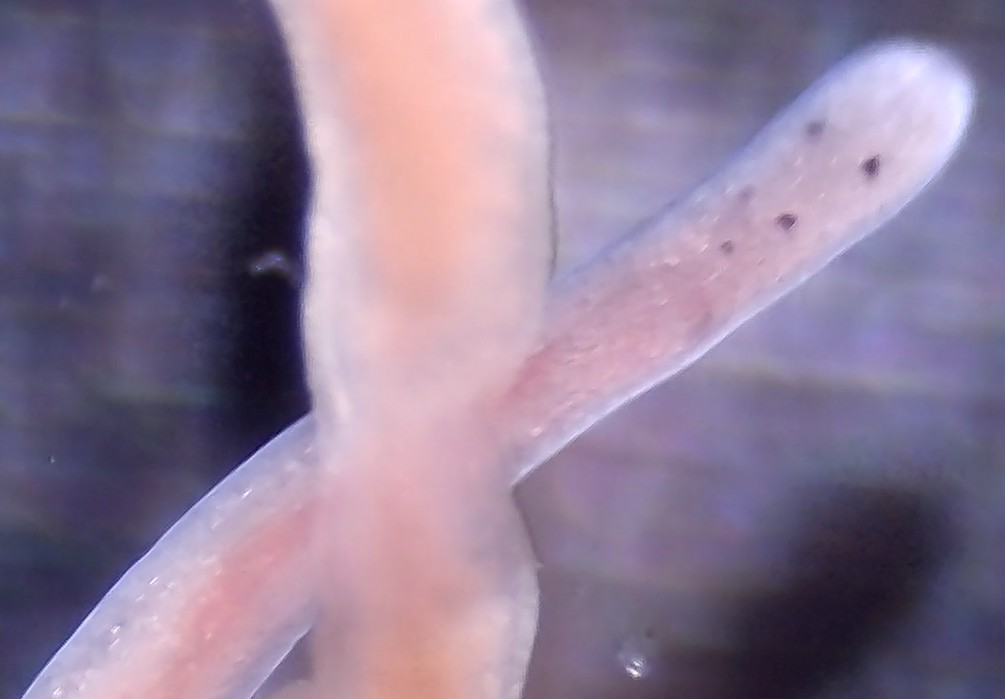
Angled view of Prostoma sp.

A pregnant Prostoma worm!
