= Neesiidae =

Scientific classification
- Kingdom: Animalia
- Phylum: Nemertea
- Class: Hoplonemertea
- Order: Monostilifera
- Suborder: Eumonostilifera
- Family: Neesiidae; Chernyshev, 2005

Family of ribbon worms

Neesiidae is a family of worms belonging to the order Monostilifera.

Genera:

- Neoemplectonema Korotkevich, 1977
- Noteonemertes Gibson, 2002
- Paranemertes Coe, 1901
- Paranemertopsis Gibson, 1990
- Tortus Korotkevich, 1971
- Vulcanonemertes Gibson & Strand, 2002
