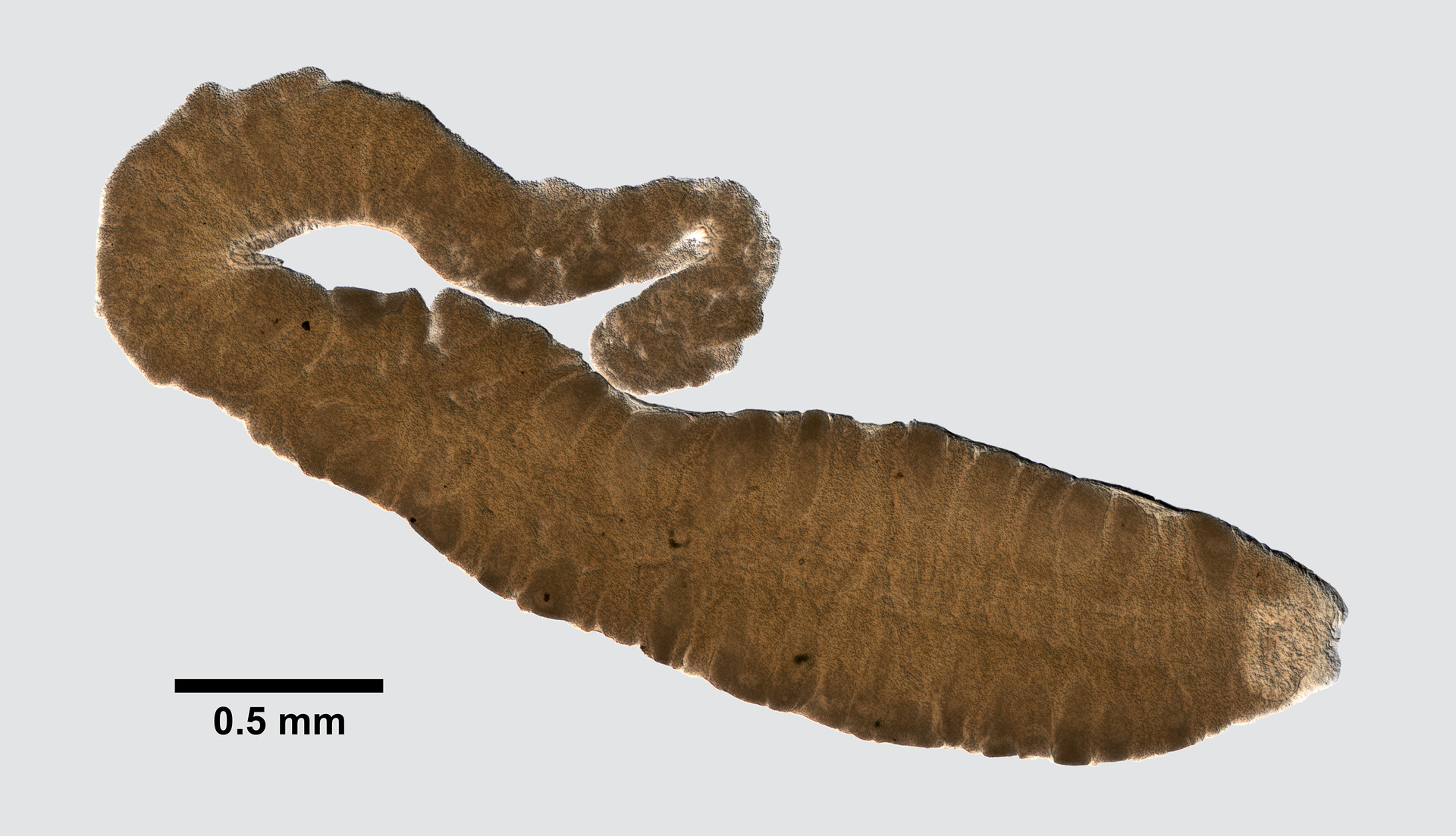

Scientific classification
- Domain: Eukaryota
- Kingdom: Animalia
- Phylum: Nemertea
- Class: Hoplonemertea
- Order: Monostilifera
- Family: Prostomatidae
- Genus: Prostoma
- Species: P. graecense

Binomial name
- Prostoma graecense (Böhmig, 1892)

Synonyms
- Monopora lacustris (du Plessis, 1892); Prostoma jenningsi Gibson & Young, 1971; Prostoma rubrum (Leidy); Stichostemma graecense (Böhmig, 1892); Tetrastemma graecense Böhmig, 1893; Tetrastemma graecensis Böhmig, 1892; Tetrastemma lacustre du Plessis, 1892

= Prostoma graecense =

Species of Nemertea

Prostoma graecense is a species of Nemertea in the family Prostomatidae. It was once called Emea rubrum. It is closely related to Prostoma eilhardi. The species is distributed all across the world.

== Characteristics ==
Individuals in this species can reach up to a length of 5 cm. It is hermaphroditic and has 2 or 3 pairs of eyes.

== Occurrence ==
It is distributed all across the world. However the authenticity of this is hard to tell. It has been reported in the continents of Europe, Africa, Asia, South America, Australia, and North America.

It has been reported in Japan, Russia, New Zealand, Kenya, Venezuela, Argentina, and Mexico. Genetic evidence indicates this species was introduced by humans.

It is the only known species of fresh water Nemertea in Australia.

It is rarely found in the United States. But in the state of Connecticut it lives in freshwater habitats. Here it usually lives among algae, plants, or detritus. It is more numerous during the Fall season.
