= Prostoma eilhardi =

Scientific classification
- Kingdom: Animalia
- Phylum: Nemertea
- Class: Hoplonemertea
- Order: Monostilifera
- Family: Prostomatidae
- Genus: Prostoma
- Species: P. eilhardi

Binomial name
- Prostoma eilhardi (Montgomery 1894)

Species of worm

Prostoma eilhardi is a species of ribbon worm. This species uses ciliary gliding to get from place to place. It is closely related to Prostoma graecense. The species has been classified as androdioecious.

The species has been reported to have a distribution across the world but not all reports may be authentic.
