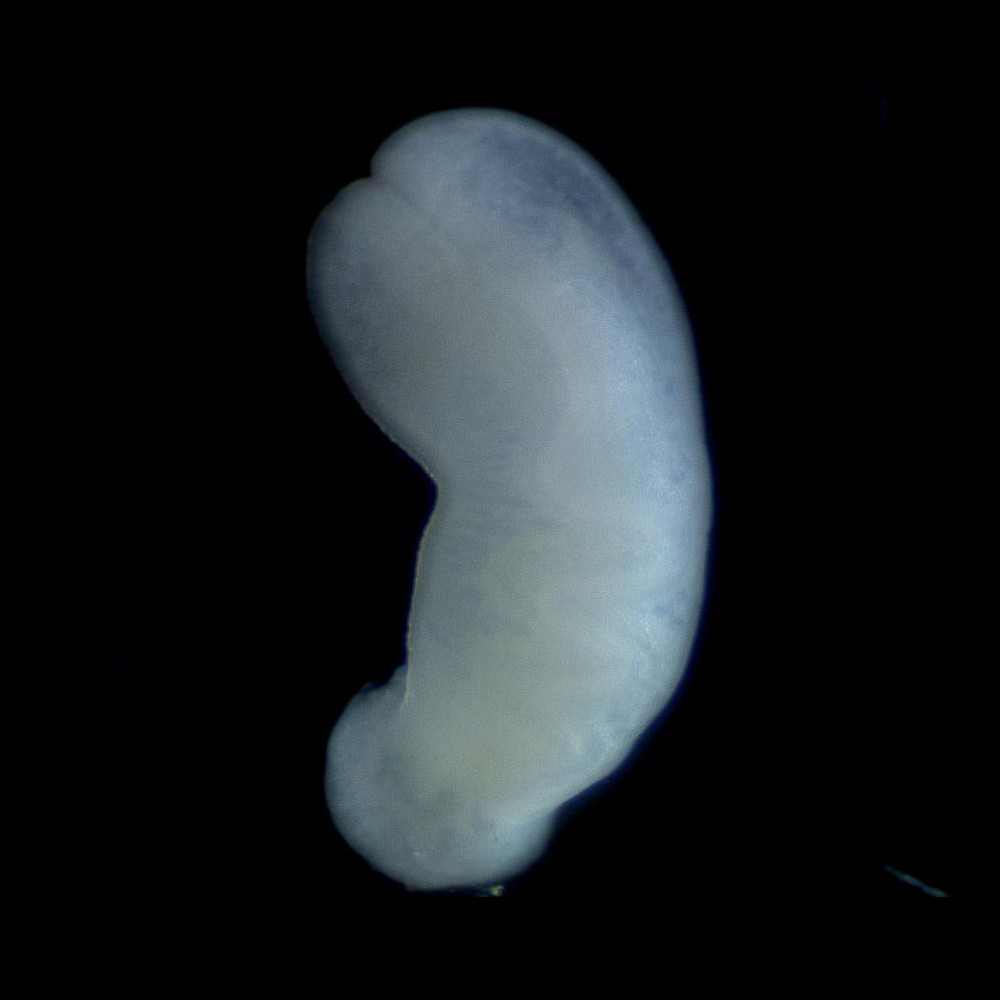
- Malacobdella sp.

Scientific classification
- Kingdom: Animalia
- Phylum: Nemertea
- Class: Hoplonemertea
- Order: Monostilifera
- Family: Malacobdellidae; Blanchard, 1847
- Genus: Malacobdella; Blainville, 1827

= Malacobdella =

Family of ribbon worms

Malacobdellidae is a monogeneric family within the phylum Nemertea. It is included with the order Hoplonemertea within the class Enopla (formerly in monotypic order Bdellonemertea of the same class).

== Morphology ==
The family, as well as its sole genus Malacobdella, is characterized by a posterior ventral sucker and a proboscis lacking a stylet. As in other Hoplonemertea, the lateral longitudinal nerve cord is located internal to the body wall muscles, in the mesenchyme.

== Ecology ==
Members of Bdellonemertea are all commensal, living in the mantle cavities of bivalves. The only non-marine and non-bivalve hosted species, Malacobdella auriculae, is doubtful. It was described in 1847 by Émile Blanchard on the basis of a single drawing of his colleague and probably wasn't even a nemertean. Malacobdella feed on small food particles that are brought into the mollusk's ctenidia.
