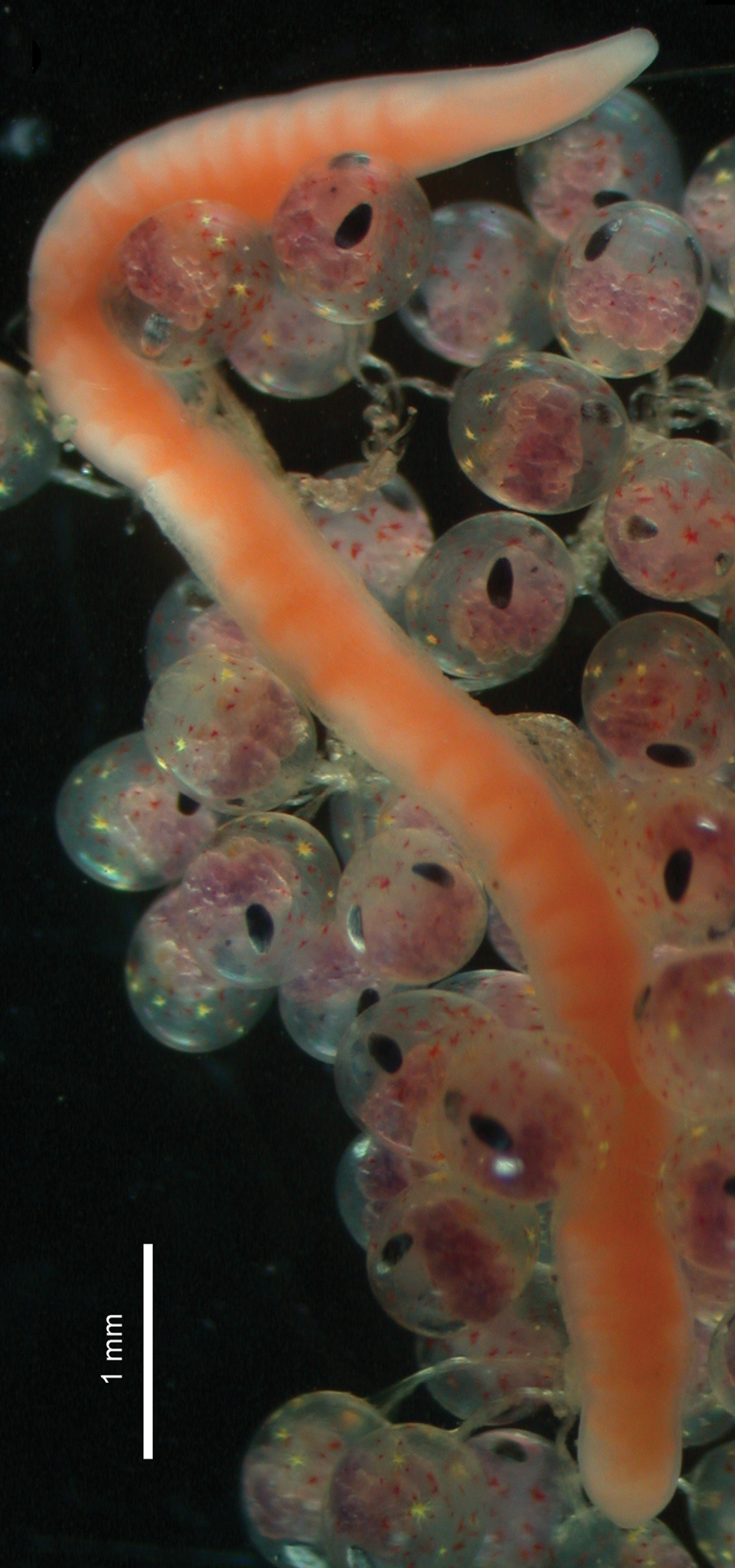
- Carcinonemertidae

Scientific classification
- Domain: Eukaryota
- Kingdom: Animalia
- Phylum: Nemertea
- Class: Hoplonemertea
- Order: Monostilifera
- Suborder: Eumonostilifera
- Family: Carcinonemertidae

= Carcinonemertidae =

Family of ribbon worms

Carcinonemertidae is a family of nemertean worms belonging to the class Hoplonemertea.

Genera:

- Carcinonemertes Coe, 1902
- Ovicides Shields, 2001
