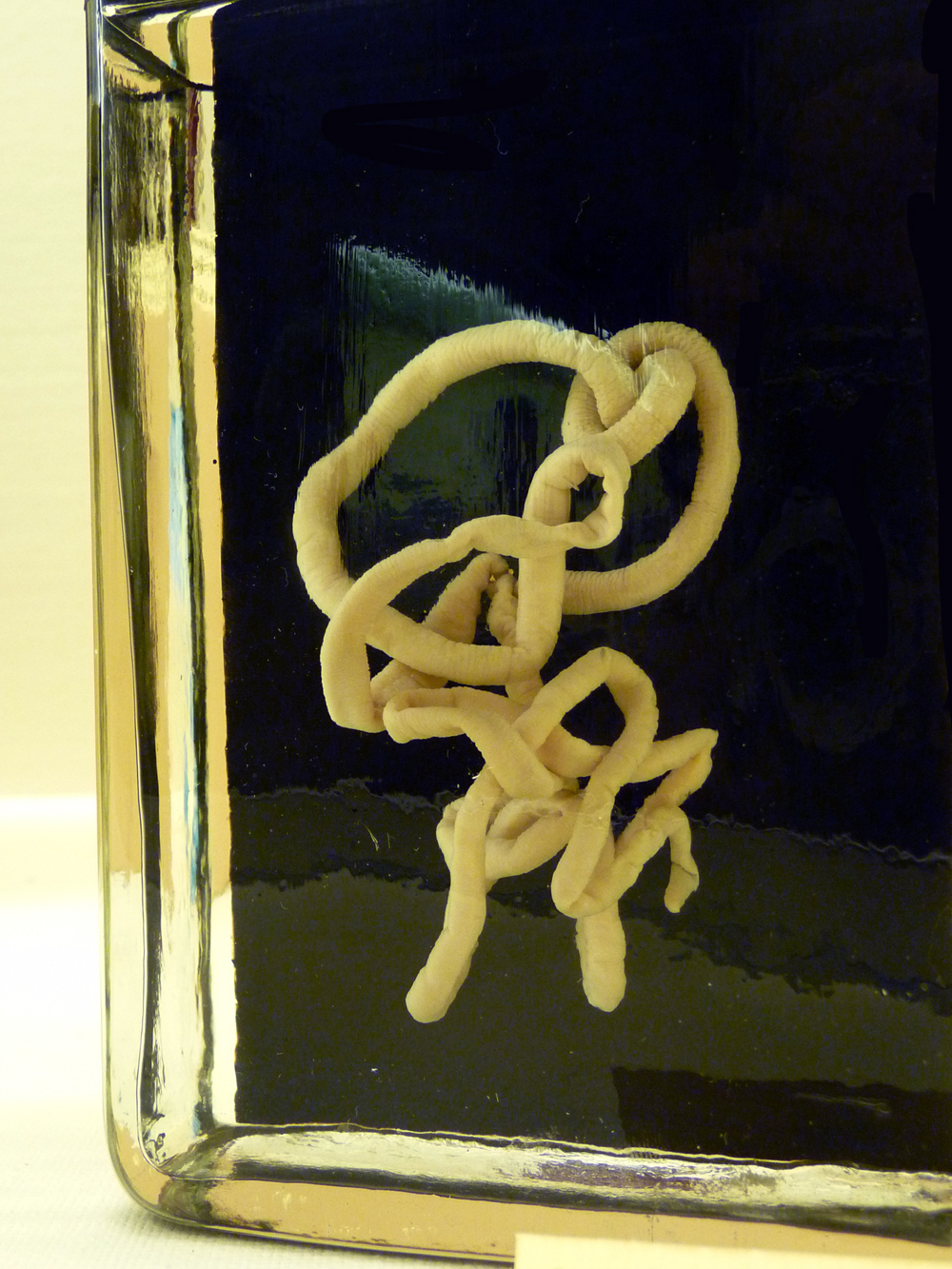
- Lineus longissimus

Scientific classification
- Kingdom: Animalia
- Phylum: Nemertea
- Class: Anopla; Schultze, 1851

Orders
- Palaeonemertea; Heteronemertea

= Anopla =

Class of marine worms of the phylum Nemertea

Anopla (for changes in taxonomy, see reference from 2019) has long been used as name for a class of marine worms of the phylum Nemertea, characterized by the absence of stylets on the proboscis, the mouth being below or behind the brain, and by having separate openings for the mouth and proboscis. The other long used class of Nemertea are the Enopla (for changes in taxonomy, see reference from 2019). Although Anopla is a paraphyletic grouping, it is used in almost all scientific classifications. Anopla is divided into two orders: Palaeonemertea and Heteronemertea.

Palaeonemertea may be para- or polyphyletic, consisting of 3-5 groupings and totalling about 100 species. These worms have several apparently simple features and, as their name suggests, they are often considered to be the most primitive nemerteans. The primary body-wall musculature consists of an outer circular stratum overlying a longitudinal stratum. The group includes genera such as Cephalothrix in which the nerve cords are inside the body-wall longitudinal muscle, and Tubulanus, in which the nerve cords are between the outer circular muscle and the epidermis. Tubulanids are commonly encountered in rocky areas of intertidal zones in the northern hemisphere. They are often bright orange or have very distinctive banding and or stripes and can be many meters long, although only a few mm thick.

Heteronemertea is a monophyletic grouping of about 500 species, containing genera such as Lineus and Cerebratulus and including the largest and most muscular nemerteans. Almost all heteronemerteans have three primary body-wall muscle strata, an outer longitudinal, middle circular, and inner longitudinal. The lateral nerve cords are outside the circular muscle, as in palaeonemerteans, but separated from the epidermis by the usually well-developed outer longitudinal muscle.

A third subclass of Anopla called the Archinemertea was determined to be paraphyletic and is no longer used by most authors. A trace fossil genus called Archisymplectes from the Pennsylvanian found in central Illinois was formerly placed in this subclass, but is now considered a Palaeonemertea, if indeed it is an Anopla.
