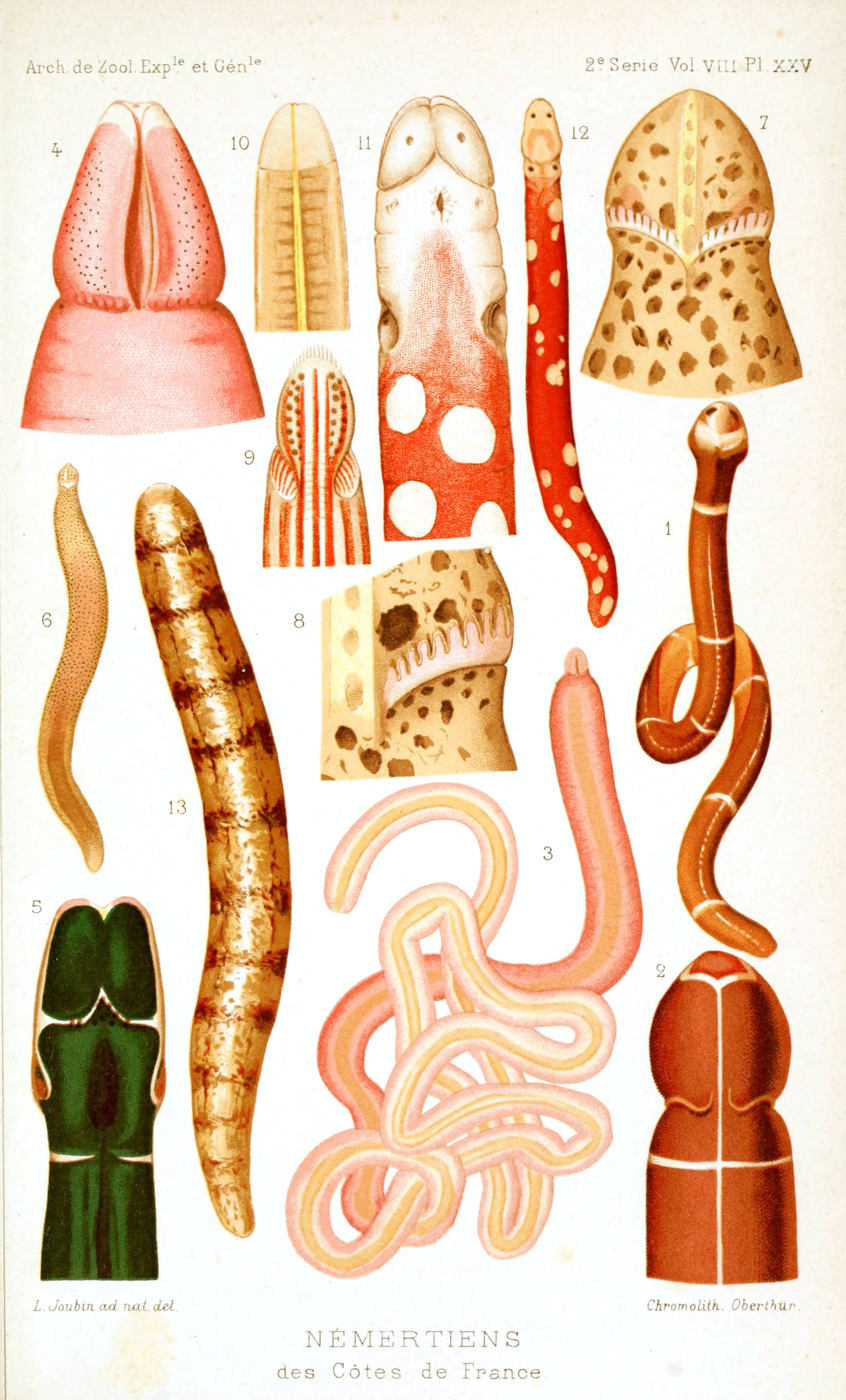

Scientific classification
- Kingdom: Animalia
- Subkingdom: Eumetazoa
- Clade: ParaHoxozoa
- Clade: Bilateria
- Clade: Nephrozoa
- Clade: Protostomia
- Clade: Spiralia
- Superphylum: Lophotrochozoa
- Phylum: Nemertea; Schultze, 1851

Classes
- Palaeonemertea; Pilidiophora; Hoplonemertea (= Enopla)

Synonyms
- Nemertini; Nemertinea; Rhynchocoela

= Nemertea =

Nemertea Temporal range: Middle Triassic–recent Possible Ordovician and Carboniferous records

Phylum of invertebrates, ribbon worms

Nemertea is a phylum of animals also known as ribbon worms or proboscis worms, consisting of about 1300 known species. Most ribbon worms are very slim, usually only a few millimeters wide, although a few have relatively short but wide bodies. Many have patterns of yellow, orange, red and green coloration. The foregut, stomach and intestine run a little below the midline of the body, the anus is at the tip of the tail, and the mouth is under the front. A little above the gut is the rhynchocoel, a cavity which mostly runs above the midline and ends a little short of the rear of the body. All species have a proboscis which lies in the rhynchocoel when inactive but everts to emerge just above the mouth to capture the animal's prey with venom. A highly extensible muscle in the back of the rhynchocoel pulls the proboscis in when an attack ends. A few species with stubby bodies filter feed and have suckers at the front and back ends, with which they attach to a host.

The brain is a ring of four ganglia, positioned around the rhynchocoel near the animal's front end. At least a pair of ventral nerve cords connect to the brain and run along the length of the body. Most nemerteans have various chemoreceptors, and on their heads some species have a number of pigment-cup ocelli, which can detect light but can not form an image. Nemerteans respire through the skin. They have at least two lateral vessels which are joined at the ends to form a loop, and these and the rhynchocoel are filled with fluid. There is no heart, and the flow of fluid depends on contraction of muscles in the vessels and the body wall. To filter out soluble waste products, flame cells are embedded in the front part of the two lateral fluid vessels, and remove the wastes through a network of pipes to the outside.

All nemerteans move slowly, using their external cilia to glide on surfaces on a trail of slime, while larger species use muscular waves to crawl, and some swim by dorso-ventral undulations. A few live in the open ocean while the rest find or make hiding places on the bottom. About a dozen species inhabit freshwater, mainly in the tropics and subtropics, and another dozen species live on land in cool, damp places. Most nemerteans are carnivores, feeding on annelids, clams and crustaceans. Some species of nemerteans are scavengers, and a few live commensally inside the mantle cavity of molluscs.

In most species the sexes are separate, but all the freshwater species are hermaphroditic. Nemerteans often have numerous temporary gonads (ovaries or testes), and build temporary gonoducts (ducts from which the ova or sperm are emitted) opening to a gonopore, one per gonad, when the ova and sperm are ready. The eggs are generally fertilised externally. Some species shed them into the water, and others protect their eggs in various ways. The fertilized egg divides by spiral cleavage and grows by determinate development, in which the fate of a cell can usually be predicted from its predecessors in the process of division. The embryos of most taxa develop either directly to form juveniles (like the adult but smaller) or larvae that resemble the planulas of cnidarians. However, some form a pilidium larva, in which the developing juvenile has a gut which lies across the larva's body, and usually eats the remains of the larva when it emerges. The bodies of some species fragment readily, and even parts cut off near the tail can grow full bodies.

Traditional taxonomy divides the phylum in two classes, Anopla ("unarmed" – their proboscises do not have a little dagger) with two orders, and Enopla ("armed" with a dagger) also with two orders. However, it is now accepted that Anopla are paraphyletic, as one order of Anopla is more closely related to Enopla than to the other order of Anopla. The phylum Nemertea itself is monophyletic, its main synapomorphies being the rhynchocoel and eversible proboscis. Traditional taxonomy says that nemerteans are closely related to flatworms, but both phyla are regarded as members of the Lophotrochozoa, a very large clade, sometimes viewed as a superphylum that also includes molluscs, annelids, brachiopods, bryozoa and many other protostomes.

== History ==
In 1555 Olaus Magnus wrote of a marine worm which was apparently 17.76 metres (58.3 ft) long ("40 cubits"), about the width of a child's arm, and whose touch made a hand swell. William Borlase wrote in 1758 of a "sea long worm", and in 1770 Gunnerus wrote a formal description of this animal, which he called Ascaris longissima. Its current name, Lineus longissimus, was first used in 1806 by Sowerby. In 1995, a total of 1,149 species had been described and grouped into 250 genera.

Nemertea are named after the Greek sea-nymph Nemertes, one of the daughters of Nereus and Doris. Alternative names for the phylum have included Nemertini, Nemertinea, and Rhynchocoela. The Nemertodermatida are a separate phylum, whose closest relatives appear to be the Acoela.

== Description ==
=== Body structure and major cavities ===
The typical nemertean body is very thin in proportion to its length. The smallest are a few millimeters long, most are less than 20 centimetres (7.9 in), and several exceed 1 metre (3.3 ft). The longest animal ever found, at 54 metres (177 ft) long, may be a specimen of Lineus longissimus, Ruppert, Fox and Barnes refer to a Lineus longissimus 54 metres (177 ft) long, washed ashore after a storm off St Andrews in Scotland. Other estimates are about 30 metres (98 ft). Zoologists find it extremely difficult to measure this species. For comparison:

- The longest recorded blue whale was 33.58 metres (110.2 ft).
- The dinosaurs Argentinosaurus and Patagotitan are estimated at approximately 35 metres (115 ft) and 31 metres (102 ft) respectively.
- A specimen of the Arctic giant jellyfish Cyanea capillata arctica was 36.5 metres (120 ft) long.

L. longissimus, however, is usually only a few millimeters wide. The bodies of most nemerteans can stretch a lot, up to 10 times their resting length in some species, but reduce their length to 50% and increase their width to 300% when disturbed. A few have relatively short but wide bodies, for example Malacobdella grossa is up to 3.5 centimetres (1.4 in) long and 1 centimetre (0.39 in) wide, and some of these are much less stretchy. Smaller nemerteans are approximately cylindrical, but larger species are flattened dorso-ventrally. Many have visible patterns in various combinations of yellow, orange, red and green.

The outermost layer of the body has no cuticle, but consists of a ciliated and glandular epithelium containing rhabdites, which form the mucus in which the cilia glide. Each ciliated cell has many cilia and microvilli. The outermost layer rests on a thickened basement membrane, the dermis. Next to the dermis are at least three layers of muscles, some circular and some longitudinal. The combinations of muscle types vary between the different classes, but these are not associated with differences in movement. Nemerteans also have dorso-ventral muscles, which flatten the animals, especially in the larger species. Inside the concentric tubes of these layers is mesenchyme, a kind of connective tissue. In pelagic species this tissue is gelatinous and buoyant.

They are unsegmented, but at least one species, Annulonemertes minusculus, is segmented. But this is assumed to be a derived trait. The segmentation does not include the coelom and body wall, and is therefore referred to as pseudosegmentation.

The mouth is ventral and a little behind the front of the body. The foregut, stomach and intestine run a little below the midline of the body and the anus is at the tip of the tail. Above the gut and separated from the gut by mesenchyme is the rhynchocoel, a cavity which mostly runs above the midline and ends a little short of the rear of the body. The rhynchocoel of class Anopla has an orifice a little to the front of the mouth, but still under the front of the body. In the other class, Enopla, the mouth and the front of the rhynchocoel share an orifice. The rhynchocoel is a coelom, as it is lined by epithelium.

=== Proboscis and feeding ===
The proboscis is an infolding of the body wall, and sits in the rhynchocoel when inactive. When muscles in the wall of the rhynchocoel compress the fluid inside, the pressure makes the proboscis jump inside-out along a canal called the rhynchodeum and through an orifice, the proboscis pore. The proboscis has a muscle which attaches to the back of the rhynchocoel, can stretch up to 30 times its inactive length and acts to retract the proboscis.

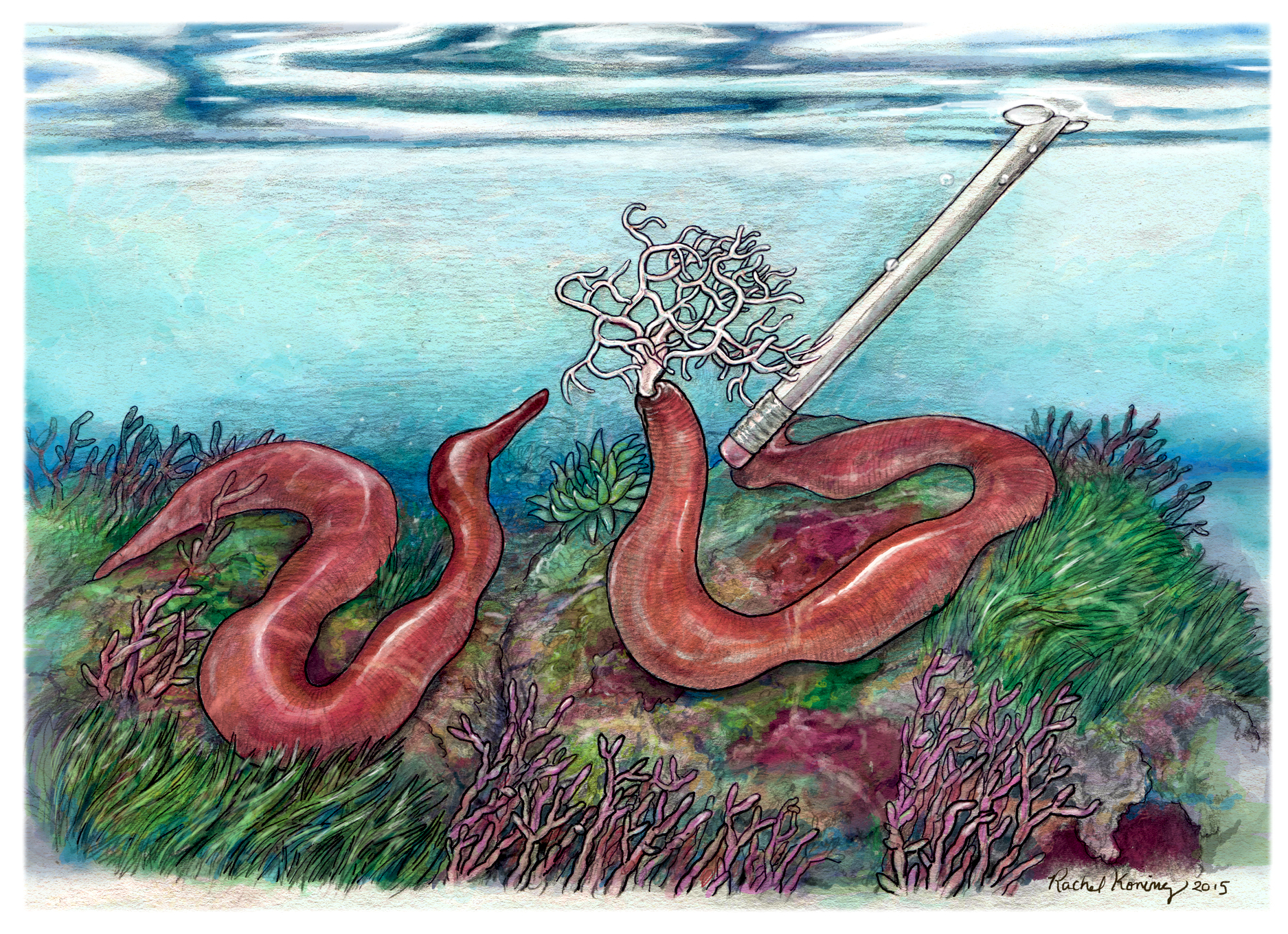
Gorgonorhynchus repens, a species within class Anopla, discharges a sticky branched proboscis.

The proboscis of the class Anopla exits from an orifice which is separate from the mouth, coils around the prey and immobilizes it by sticky, toxic secretions. The Anopla can attack as soon as the prey moves into the range of the proboscis. Some Anopla have branched proboscises which can be described as "a mass of sticky spaghetti". The animal then draws its prey into its mouth.

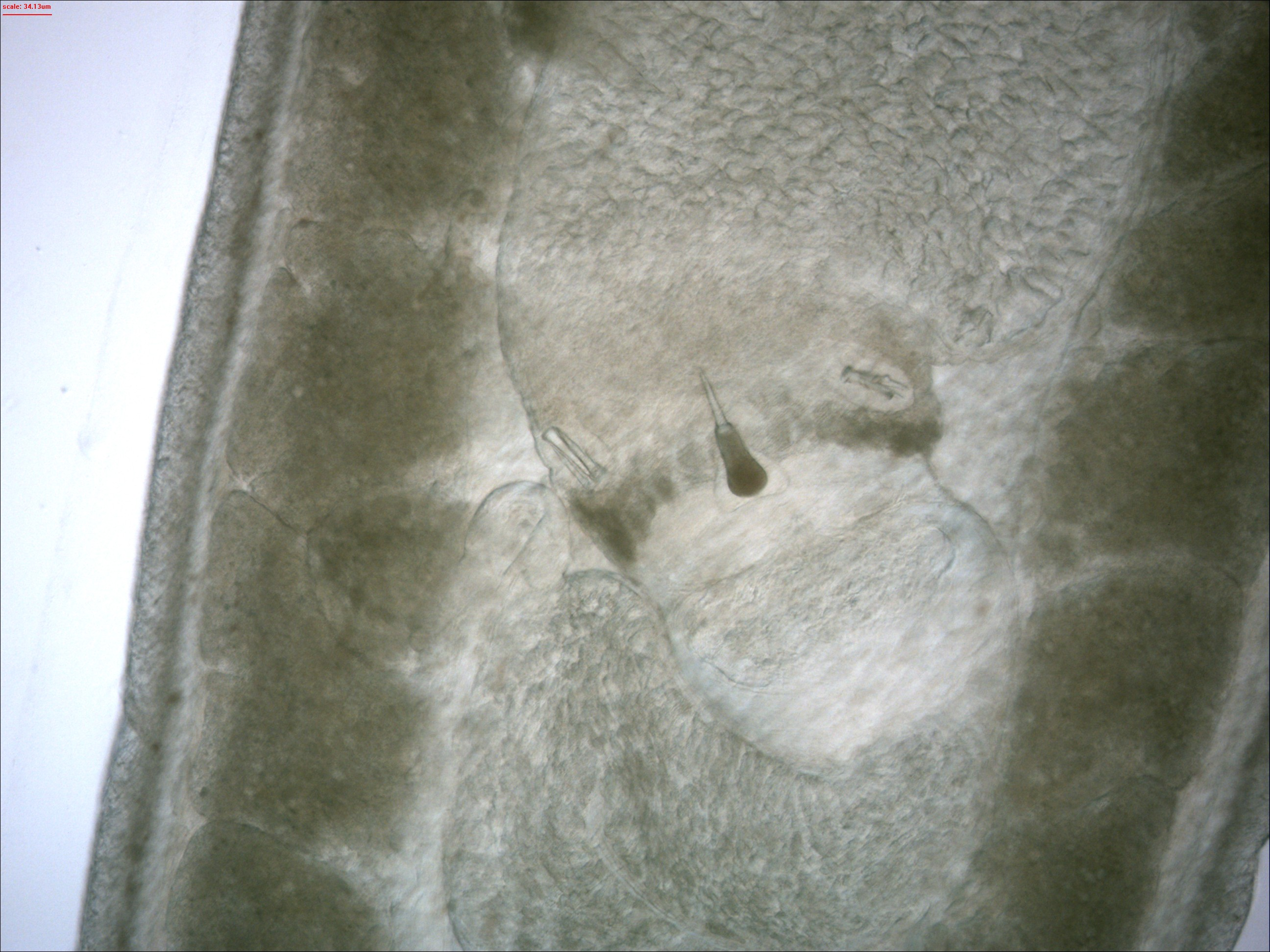
Stylet-containing part of proboscis of "armed" nemertean Amphiporus ochraceus.

In most of the class Enopla, the proboscis exits from a common orifice of the rhynchocoel and mouth. A typical member of this class has a stylet, a calcareous barb, with which the animal stabs the prey many times to inject toxins and digestive secretions. The prey is then swallowed whole or, after partial digestion, its tissues are sucked into the mouth. The stylet is attached about one-third of the distance from the end of the everted proboscis, which extends only enough to expose the stylet. On either side of the active stylet are sacs containing back-up stylets to replace the active one as the animal grows or an active one is lost. Instead of one stylet, the Polystilifera have a pad that bears many tiny stylets, and these animals have separate orifices for the proboscis and mouth, unlike other Enopla. The Enopla can only attack after contacting the prey.

Some nemerteans, such as L. longissimus, absorb organic food in solution through their skins, which may make the long, slim bodies an advantage. Suspension feeding is found only among the specialized symbiotic bdellonemerteans, which have a proboscis but no stylet, and use suckers to attach themselves to bivalves.

=== Respiration and circulatory system ===
Nemerteans lack specialized gills, and respiration occurs over the surface of the body, which is long and sometimes flattened. Like other animals with thick body walls, they use fluid circulation rather than diffusion to move substances through their bodies. The circulatory system consists of the rhynchocoel and peripheral vessels, while their blood is contained in the main body cavity. The fluid in the rhynchocoel moves substances to and from the proboscis, and functions as a fluid skeleton in everting the proboscis and in burrowing. The vessels circulate fluid round the whole body and the rhynchocoel provides its own local circulation. The circulatory vessels are a system of coeloms.

In the simplest type of circulatory system, two lateral vessels are joined at the ends to form a loop. However, many species have additional long-wise and cross-wise vessels. There is no heart nor pumping vessels, and the flow of fluid depends on contraction of both the vessels and the body wall's muscles. In some species, circulation is intermittent, and fluid ebbs and flows in the long-wise vessels. The fluid in the vessels is usually colorless, but in some species it contains cells that are yellow, orange, green or red. The red type contain hemoglobin and carry oxygen, but the function of the other pigments is unknown.

=== Excretion ===
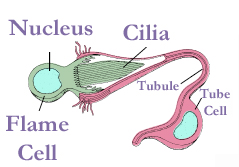
A schematic representation of a flame cell and other associated structures

Nemertea use organs called protonephridia to excrete soluble waste products, especially nitrogenous by-products of cellular metabolism. In nemertean protonephridia, flame cells which filter out the wastes are embedded in the front part of the two lateral fluid vessels. The flame cells remove the wastes into two collecting ducts, one on either side, and each duct has one or more nephridiopores through which the wastes exit. Semiterrestrial and freshwater nemerteans have many more flame cells than marines, sometimes thousands. The reason may be that osmoregulation is more difficult in non-marine environments.

=== Nervous-system and senses ===
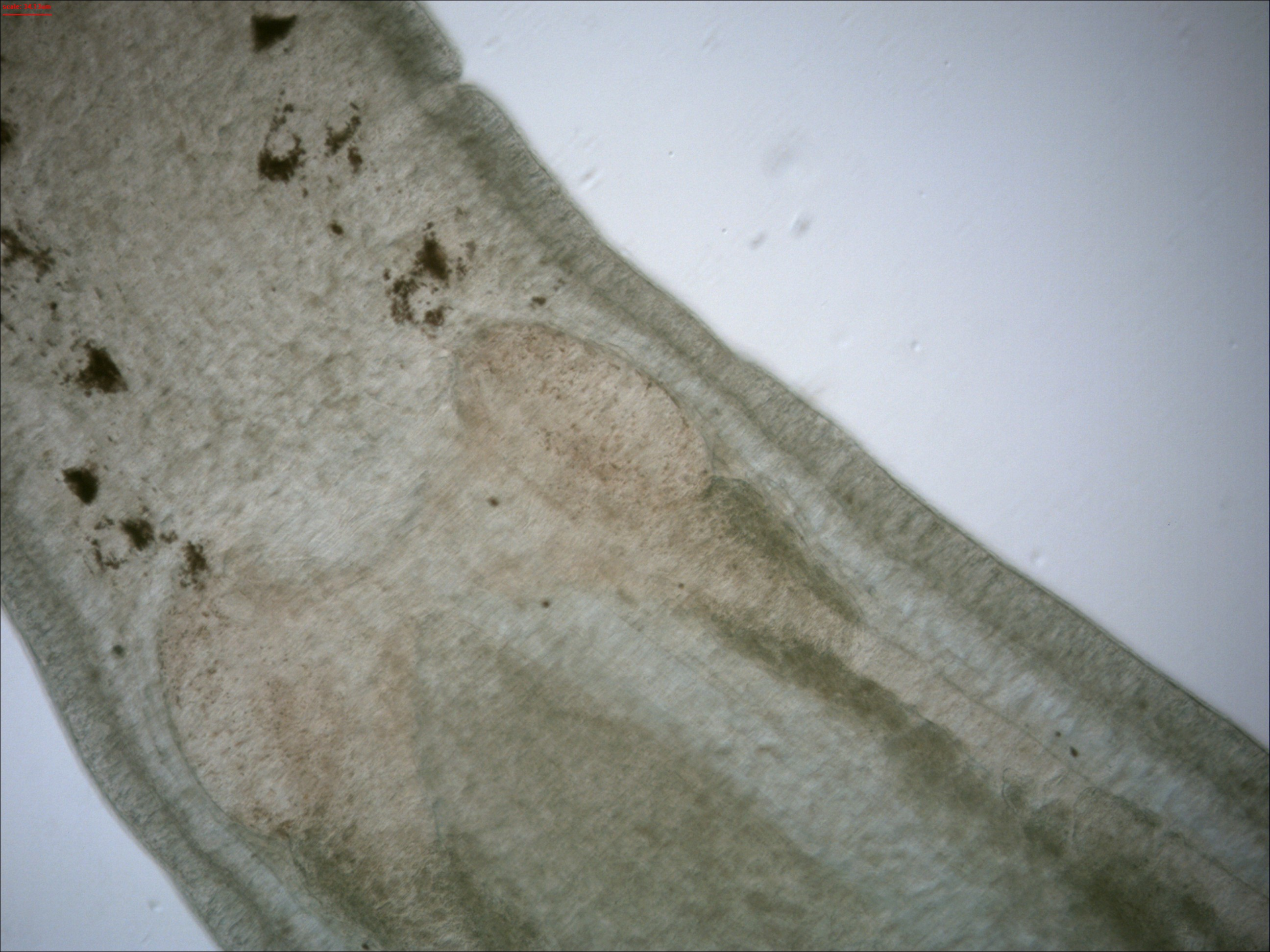
Brain and neural cords of hoplonemertean Amphiporus ochraceus. Several clusters of dark eyespots and the opening of one cerebral organ are also visible.

The central nervous-system consists of a brain and paired ventral nerve cords that connect to the brain and run along the length of the body. The brain is a ring of four ganglia, masses of nerve cells, positioned round the rhynchocoel near its front end – while the brains of most protostome invertebrates encircle the foregut. Most nemertean species have just one pair of nerve cords, many species have additional paired cords, and some species also have a dorsal cord. In some species the cords lie within the skin, but in most they are deeper, inside the muscle layers. The central nervous-system is often red or pink because it contains hemoglobin. This stores oxygen for peak activity or when the animal experiences anoxia, for example while burrowing in oxygen-free sediments.

Some species have paired cerebral organs, sacs whose only openings are to the outside. Others species have unpaired evertible organs on the front of their heads. Some have slits along the side of the head or grooves obliquely across the head, and these may be associated with paired cerebral organs. All of these are thought to be chemoreceptors, and the cerebral organs may also aiding osmoregulation. Small pits in the epidermis appear to be sensors. On their head, some species have a number of pigment-cup ocelli, which can detect light but not form an image. Most nemerteans have two to six ocelli, although some have hundreds. A few tiny species that live between grains of sand have statocysts, which sense balance.

Paranemertes peregrina, which feeds on polychaetes, can follow the prey's trails of mucus, and find its burrow by backtracking along its own trail of mucus.

=== Movement ===
The nemertean Geonemertes pelaensis (right) being inspected by a spider, which it then captures.

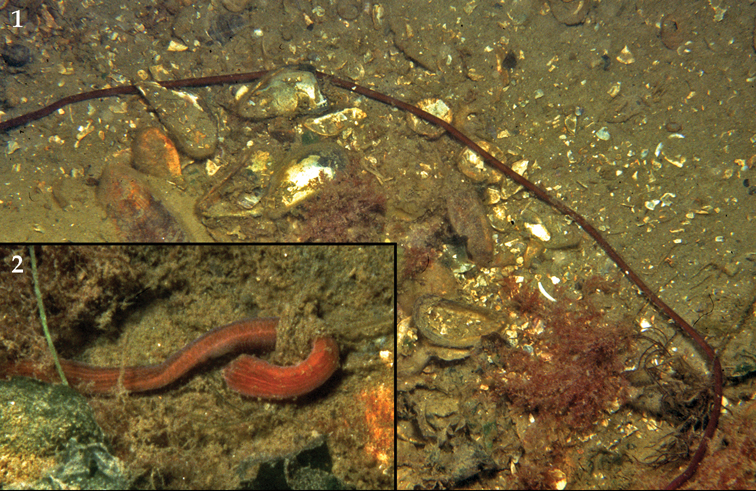
Lineus longissimus in Grevelingen

Nemerteans generally move slowly, though they have occasionally been documented to successfully prey on spiders or insects. Most nemerteans use their external cilia to glide on surfaces on a trail of slime, some of which is produced by glands in the head. Larger species use muscular waves to crawl, and some aquatic species swim by dorso-ventral undulations. Some species burrow by means of muscular peristalsis, and have powerful muscles. Some species of the suborder Monostilifera, whose proboscis have one active stylet, move by extending the proboscis, sticking it to an object and pulling the animal toward the object.

=== Reproduction and life-cycle ===
Larger species often break up when stimulated, and the fragments often grow into full individuals. Some species fragment routinely and even parts near the tail can grow full bodies. But this kind of extreme regeneration is restricted to only a few types of nemerteans, and is assumed to be a derived feature. All reproduce sexually, and most species are gonochoric (the sexes are separate), but all the freshwater forms are hermaphroditic.

Nemerteans often have numerous temporary gonads (ovaries or testes), forming a row down each side of the body in the mesenchyme. Temporary gonoducts (ducts from which the ova or sperm are emitted), one per gonad, are built when the ova and sperm are ready. The eggs are generally fertilised externally. Some species shed them into the water, some lay them in a burrow or tube, and some protect them by cocoons or gelatinous strings. Some bathypelagic (deep sea) species have internal fertilization, and some of these are viviparous, growing their embryos in the female's body.

The zygote (fertilised egg) divides by spiral cleavage and grows by determinate development, in which the fate of a cell can usually be predicted from its predecessors in the process of division. The embryos of most taxa develop either directly to form juveniles (like the adult but smaller) or to form planuliform larvae. The planuliform larva stage may be short-lived and lecithotrophic ("yolky") before becoming a juvenile, or may be planktotrophic, swimming for some time and eating prey larger than microscopic particles. However, many members of the order Heteronemertea and the palaeonemertean family Hubrechtiidae form a pilidium larva, which can capture unicellular algae and which Maslakova describes as like a deerstalker cap with the ear flaps pulled down. It has a gut which lies across the body, a mouth between the "ear flaps", but no anus. A small number of imaginal discs form, encircling the archenteron (developing gut) and coalesce to form the juvenile. When it is fully formed, the juvenile bursts out of the larva body and usually eats it during this catastrophic metamorphosis. This larval stage is unique in that there are no Hox genes involved during development, which are only found in the juveniles developing inside the larvae.

The species Paranemertes peregrina has been reported as having a life span of around 18 months.

== Ecological significance ==
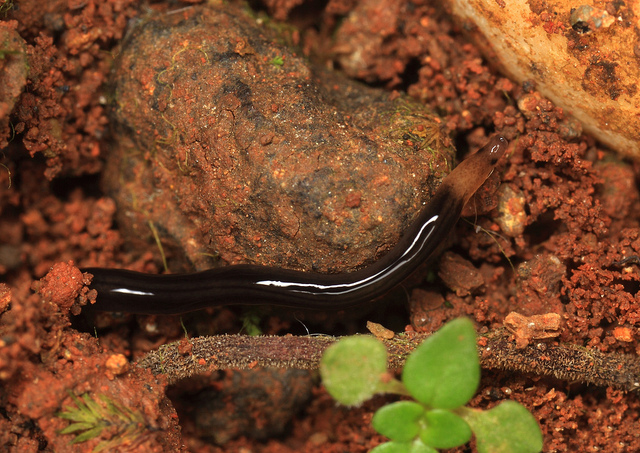
A terrestrial nemertean from West Java. The animal is 1.5 centimetres (0.59 in) long, of which the anterior 1 centimetre (0.39 in) is visible.

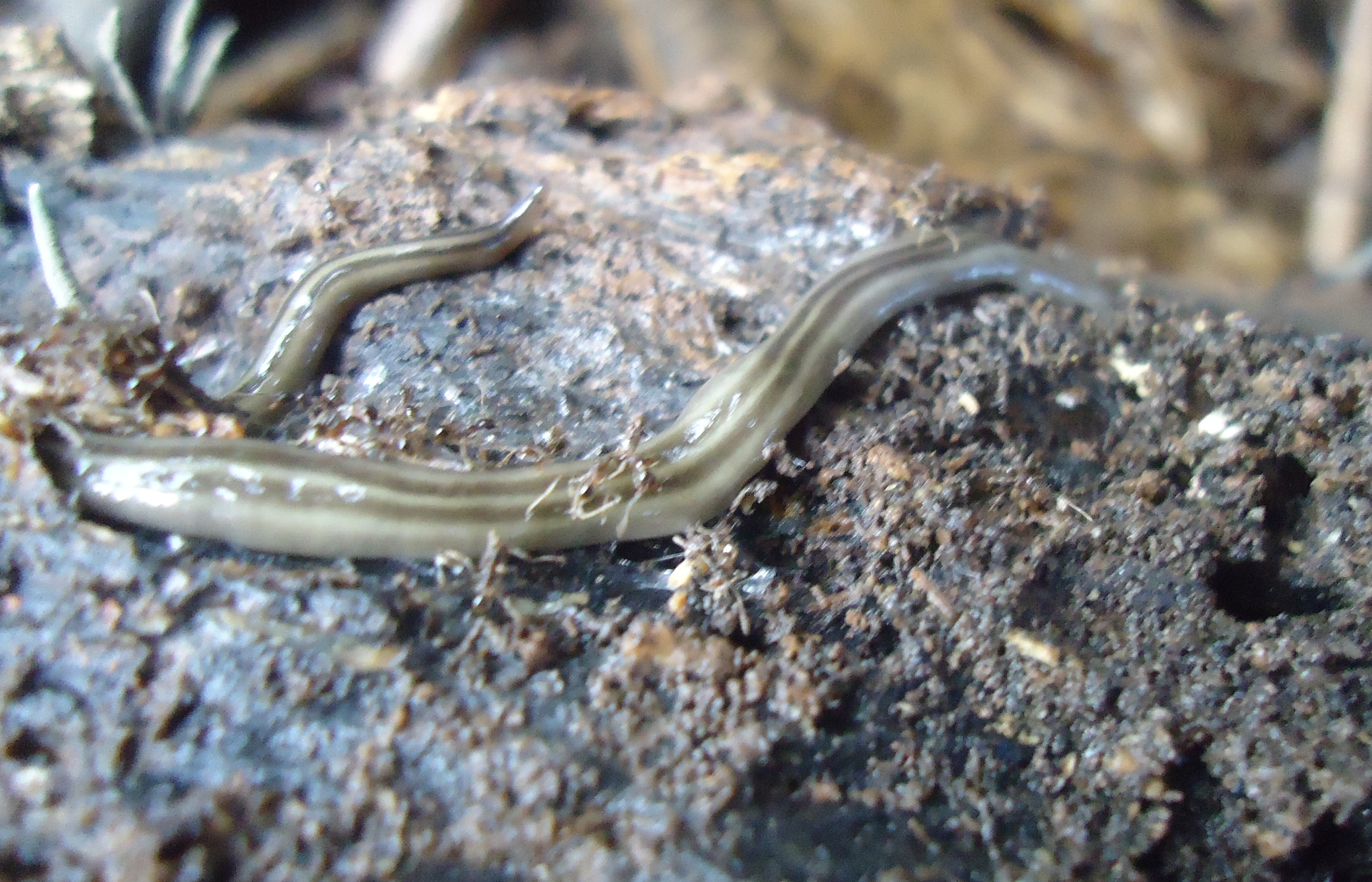
A terrestrial Geonemertes sp. on a rotting log, from Mindanao Island, the Philippines

Most nemerteans are marine animals that burrow in sediments, lurk in crevices between shells, stones or the holdfasts of algae or sessile animals. Some live deep in the open oceans, and have gelatinous bodies. Others build semi-permanent burrows lined with mucus or produce cellophane-like tubes. Mainly in the tropics and subtropics, about 12 species appear in freshwater, and about a dozen species live on land in cool, damp places, for example under rotting logs.

The terrestrial Argonemertes dendyi is a native of Australia but has been found in the British Isles, in Sao Miguel in the Azores, in Gran Canaria, and in a lava tube at Kaumana on the Island of Hawaii. It can build a cocoon, which allows it to avoid desiccation while being transported, and it may be able to build populations quickly in new areas as it is a protandrous hermaphrodite. Another terrestrial genus, Geonemertes, is mostly found in Australasia but has species in the Seychelles, widely across the Indo-Pacific, in Tristan da Cunha in the South Atlantic, in Frankfurt, in the Canary Islands, in Madeira and in the Azores. Geonemertes pelaensis has been implicated in the decline of native arthropod species on the Ogasawara Islands, where it was introduced in the 1980s.

Most are carnivores, feeding on annelids, clams and crustaceans, and may kill annelids of about their own size. They sometimes take fish, both living and dead. Insects and myriapods are the only known prey of the two terrestrial species of Argonemertes. A few nemerteans are scavengers, and these generally have good distance chemoreception ("smell") and are not selective about their prey. A few species live commensally inside the mantle cavity of molluscs and feed on micro-organisms filtered out by the host.

Near San Francisco the nemertean Carcinonemertes errans has consumed about 55% of the total egg production of its host, the dungeness crab Metacarcinus magister. C. errans is considered a significant factor in the collapse of the dungeness crab fishery. Other coastal nemerteans have devastated clam beds.

The few predators on nemerteans include bottom-feeding fish, some sea birds, a few invertebrates including horseshoe crabs, and other nemerteans. Nemerteans' skins secrete toxins that deter many predators, but some crabs may clean nemerteans with one claw before eating them. The American Cerebratulus lacteus and the South African Polybrachiorhynchus dayi, both called "tapeworms" in their respective localities, are sold as fish bait.

== Taxonomy ==
Traditional taxonomic classification has divided the group into two classes and four orders:

- Class Anopla ("unarmed"). Includes animals with proboscis without stylet, and a mouth underneath and behind the brain.
  - Order Palaeonemertea. Comprises 100 marine species. Their body wall has outer circular and inner length-wise muscles. In addition, Carinoma tremaphoros has circular and inner length-wise muscles in the epidermis; the extra muscle layers seem to be needed for burrowing by peristalsis.
  - Order Heteronemertea. Comprises about 400 species. The majority are marine, but three are freshwater. Their body-wall muscles are disposed in four layers, alternately circular and length-wise starting from the outermost layer. The order includes the strongest swimmers. Two genera have branched proboscises.
- Class Enopla ("armed"). All have stylets except order Bdellonemertea. Their mouth is located underneath and ahead of the brain. Their main nerve cords run inside body-wall muscles.
  - Order Bdellonemertea. Includes seven species, of which six live as commensals in the mantle of large clams and one in that of a freshwater snail. The hosts filter feed and all the hosts steal food from them. These nemerteans have short, wide bodies and have no stylets but have a sucking pharynx and a posterior stucker, with which they move like inchworms.
  - Order Hoplonemertea. Comprises 650 species. They live in benthic and pelagic sea water, in freshwater and on land. They feed by commensalism and parasitism, and are armed with stylet(s)
    - Suborder Monostilifera. Includes 500 species with a single central stylet. Some use the stylet for locomotion as well as for capturing prey.
    - Suborder Polystilifera. Includes about 100 pelagic and 50 benthic species. Their pads bear many tiny stylets.

Recent molecular phylogenetic studies divided the group into two superclasses, three classes, and eight orders:

- Superclass Pronemertea
  - Class Palaeonemertea
    - Order Carinomiformes
    - Order Tubulaniformes
    - Order Archinemertea
- Superclass Neonemertea
  - Class Pilidiophora
    - Order Hubrechtiiformes
    - Order Heteronemertea
  - Class Hoplonemertea (= Enopla)
    - Order Polystilifera
    - Order Monostilifera (includes Bdellonemertea)
- incertae sedis
  - Order Arhynchonemertea (provisionally has been separated its own class Arhynchocoela in 1995)

== Evolutionary history ==
=== Fossil record ===
As nemerteans are mostly soft-bodied, one would expect fossils of them to be extremely rare. One might expect the stylet of a nemertean to be preserved, since it is made of calcium phosphate, but no fossil stylets have yet been found. Knaust (2010) reported nemertean fossils and traces from the Middle Triassic of Germany.

The Middle Cambrian fossil Amiskwia from the Burgess Shale has been classed as a nemertean, based on a resemblance to some unusual deep-sea swimming nemerteans, but few paleontologists accept this classification as the Burgess Shale fossils show no evidence of rhynchocoel nor intestinal caeca.

Knaust & Desrochers (2019) reported fossils of vermiform organisms with a wide range of morphologies occurring on bedding planes from the Late Ordovician (Katian) Vauréal Formation (Canada). In the specimens preserving the anterior end of the body, this end is pointed or rounded, bearing a rhynchocoel with the proboscis, which is characteristic for nemerteans. The authors attributed these fossils to nemerteans and interpreted them as the oldest record of the group reported so far. However, Knaust & Desrochers cautioned that partly preserved putative nemertean fossils might ultimately turn out to be fossils of turbellarians or annelids.

It has been suggested that Archisymplectes, one of the Pennsylvanian-age animals from Mazon Creek in northern and central Illinois, may be a nemertean. This fossil, however, only preserves the outline of the "worm", and there is no evidence of a proboscis, so there is no certainty that it represents a nemertean.

=== Within Nemertea ===
- Nemertea
  - Palaeonemertea
  - - - Heteronemertea
    - - Enopla
        - - Bdellonemertea
        - - Hoplonemertea
            Monostilifera
          - Polystilifera

Groups within Nemertea, by Ruppert, Fox & Barnes (2004a).
highlights the "Anopla", which are paraphyletic.

There is no doubt that the phylum Nemertea is monophyletic (meaning that the phylum includes all and only descendants of one ancestor that was also a member of the phylum). The synapomorphies (trait shared by an ancestor and all its descendants, but not by other groups) include the eversible proboscis located in the rhynchocoel.

While Ruppert, Fox & Barnes (2004a) treat the Palaeonemertea as monophyletic, Thollesson & Norenburg (2003) regard them as paraphyletic and basal (contains the ancestors of the more recent clades). The Anopla ("unarmed") represent an evolutionary grade of nemerteans without stylets (comprising the Heteronemertea and the Palaeonemerteans), while Enopla ("armed") are monophyletic, but find that Palaeonemertea is doubly paraphyletic, having given rise to both the Heteronemertea and the Enopla. Ruppert, Fox & Barnes (2004a) treat the Bdellonemertea as a clade separate from the Hoplonemertea, while Thollesson & Norenburg (2003) believe the Bdellonemertea are a part of the Monostilifera (with one active stylet), which are within the Hoplonemertea – which implies that "Enopla" and "Hoplonemertea" are synonyms for the same branch of the tree. The Polystilifera (with many tiny stylets) are monophyletic.

=== Relationships with other phyla ===
English-language writings have conventionally treated nemerteans as acoelomate bilaterians that are most closely related to flatworms (Platyhelminthes). These pre-cladistics analyses emphasised as shared features: multiciliated (with multiple cilia per cell), glandular epidermis; rod-shaped secretory bodies or rhabdites; frontal glands or organs; protonephridia; and acoelomate body organization. However, multiciliated epidermal cells and epidermal gland cells are also found in Ctenophora, Annelida, Mollusca and other taxa. The rhabdites of nemertea have a different structure from those of flatworms at the microscopic scale. The frontal glands or organs of flatworms vary a lot in structure, and similar structures appear in small marine annelids and entoproct larvae. The protonephridia of nemertea and flatworms are different in structure, and in position – the flame cells of nemertea are usually in the walls of the fluid vessels and are served by "drains" from which the wastes exit by a small number of tubes through the skin, while the flame cells of flatworms are scattered throughout the body. Rigorous comparisons show no synapomorphies of nemertean and platyhelminth nephridia.

According to more recent analyses, in the development of nemertean embryos, ectomesoderm (outer part of the mesoderm, which is the layer in which most of the internal organs are built) is derived from cells labelled 3a and 3b, and endomesoderm (inner part of the mesoderm) is derived from the 4d cell. Some of the ectomesoderm in annelids, echiurans and molluscs is derived from cells 3a and 3b, while the ectomesoderm of polyclad flatworms is derived from the 2b cell and acoel flatworms produce no ectomesoderm. In nemerteans the space between the epidermis and the gut is mainly filled by well-developed muscles embedded in noncellular connective tissue. This structure is similar to that found in larger flatworms such as polyclads and triclads, but a similar structure of body-wall muscles embedded in noncellular connective tissue is widespread among the Spiralia (animals in which the early cell divisions make a spiral pattern) such as sipunculans, echiurans and many annelids.

- Bilateria
  - - Acoelomorpha
      - Acoela
      - Nemertodermatida
  - - Deuterostomia
      (Echinoderms, chordates, etc.)
    - Protostomia
      - Ecdysozoa
        (Arthropods, nematodes, priapulids, etc.)
      - Lophotrochozoa
        - Bryozoa
        - - Annelida (and phyla merged into them)
          - Mollusca
          - - Phoronida
            - Brachiopoda
          - Nemertea
          - Dicyemida
          - Myzostomida
          - - Platyzoa
              - - Platyhelminthes
                - Gastrotricha
              - (other Platyzoans)

Relationships of Nemertea to other Bilateria:

Nemerteans' affinities with Annelida (including Echiura, Pogonophora, Vestimentifera and perhaps Sipuncula) and Mollusca make the ribbon-worms members of Lophotrochozoa, which include about half of the extant animal phyla. Lophotrochozoa groups: those animals that feed using a lophophore (Brachiopoda, Bryozoa, Phoronida, Entoprocta); phyla in which most members' embryos develop into trochophore larvae (for example Annelida and Mollusca); and some other phyla (such as Platyhelminthes, Sipuncula, Gastrotricha, Gnathostomulida, Micrognathozoa, Nemertea, Phoronida, Platyhelminthes, and Rotifera). These groupings are based on molecular phylogeny, which compares sections of organisms DNA and RNA. While analyses by molecular phylogeny are confident that members of Lophotrochozoa are more closely related to each other than of non-members, the relationships between members are mostly unclear.

Most protostome phyla outside the Lophotrochozoa are members of Ecdysozoa ("animals that molt"), which include Arthropoda, Nematoda and Priapulida. Most other bilaterian phyla are in the Deuterostomia, which include Echinodermata and Chordata. The Acoelomorpha, which are neither protostomes nor deuterostomes, are regarded as basal bilaterians.

== See also ==
- Emplectonema neesii
- Lineus longissimus
- Parborlasia corrugatus
