= Emil Huschke =

German anatomist (1797–1858)

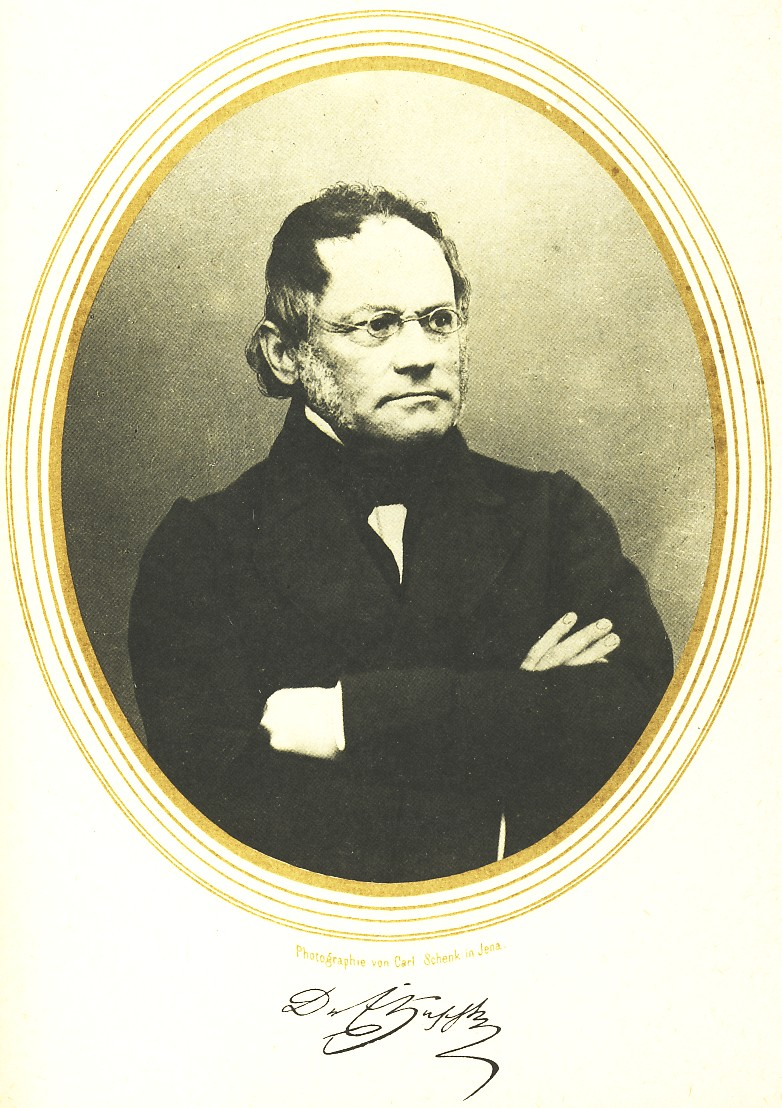
Emil Huschke (1858).

Emil Huschke (14 December 1797 – 19 June 1858) was a German anatomist and embryologist who was a native of Weimar.

He studied medicine at the University of Jena, and spent most of his professional career at Jena. In 1827 he was appointed professor of anatomy and director of the anatomical institute. Huschke was politically active and took part in the foundation of the Deutsche Burschenschaft, a student movement for German national unity. In 1867 his daughter, Agnes Huschke, married famed biologist Ernst Haeckel (1834–1919).

Although Huschke was a devoted advocate of nature philosophy, and sought to find the connection between brain and soul (Hirn und Seele), he made significant contributions in comparative anatomy. He was the first to describe a handful of anatomical structures that now contain his name, including:

- Auditory teeth of Huschke: Tooth-shaped ridges occurring on the vestibular lip of the limbus lamina spiralis of the cochlear duct.
- Huschke's cartilages: Two horizontal cartilaginous rods at the edge of the cartilage of the nasal septum.
- Huschke's foramen: An opening in the floor of the bony part of the external acoustic meatus in the vicinity of the tympanic membrane. It is normally closed in adults.

In 1829 Huschke described the heteronemertean genus Notospermus (family Lineidae).
