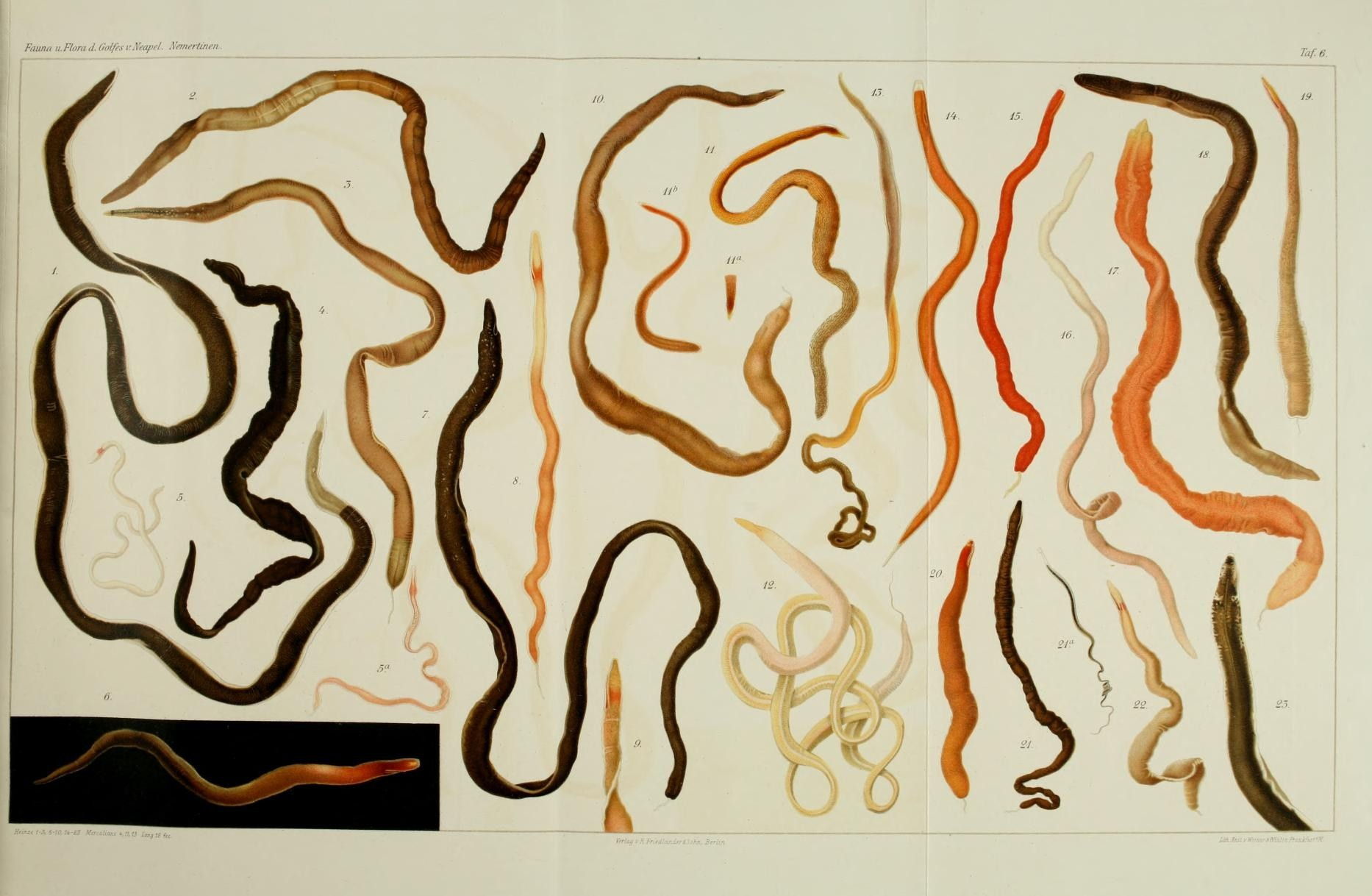
- C. marginatus on left

Scientific classification
- Domain: Eukaryota
- Kingdom: Animalia
- Phylum: Nemertea
- Class: Pilidiophora
- Order: Heteronemertea
- Family: Lineidae
- Genus: Cerebratulus
- Species: C. marginatus

Binomial name
- Cerebratulus marginatus Renier, 1804

Synonyms
- Avenardia alileuti Giard, 1878; Avenardia priei; Borlasia alileuti; Cerebratulus angulosus Haddon, 1886; Cerebratulus fragilis; Cerebratulus grandis; Cerebratulus spraguei; Gordius fragilis; Lineus beattiaei (Gray, 1857); Meckelia beattiaei (Gray, 1857); Meckelia serpentaria Diesing, 1850; Meckelia somatotomus Leuckart, 1828; Nemertes somatotomus; Ophyocephalus bilineata; Ophyocephalus bilineatus; Polia siphunculus Delle Chiaje, 1828; Serpentaria beattiei (Gray, 1857)

= Cerebratulus marginatus =

Species of ribbon worm

Cerebratulus marginatus is a proboscis worm in the family Lineidae. This ribbon worm has an Arctic distribution, and in the North Atlantic Ocean ranges as far south as Cape Cod and the Mediterranean Sea while in the Pacific Ocean it extends southwards to California.

== Description ==
Cerebratulus marginatus is a long, flattened worm that when fully extended grows to a length of over a metre (yard), but can contract to less than half its full length. Its width can be around 25 mm (1 in). The head tapers to a blunt point and the cephalic furrows are wide. The eyes contain dark pigment and are tiny and difficult to distinguish. Behind the mouth the body becomes dorso-ventrally flattened and often has wrinkles and folds which gives the worm its convoluted appearance. At the end of the body is a slender transparent caudal cirrus. The colour of this worm is somewhat variable; it is usually greyish-brown with pale or transparent edges, but the dorsal surface in older individuals is often darker than the ventral surface; other individuals are slate blue, dark brown or greyish-green. The pinkish nerve cords are often visible through the pale edges of the worm, and in young individuals the cerebral ganglia and the folded proboscis may also be discernible through the skin.

== Distribution and habitat ==
Cerebratulus marginatus is native to the northern hemisphere, occurring in the Arctic and the North Atlantic Ocean, as far south as the Mediterranean Sea in the east and Cape Cod in the west. In the Pacific Ocean it occurs between Alaska and San Diego, California, and in Japan. It occurs buried in soft sediment in the littoral zone but is more common in the sublittoral zone at depths of 20 to 150 m (70 to 490 ft).

== Biology ==
Like other ribbon worms, C. marginatus is a predator. The proboscis is able to be turned inside out to grasp prey and the diet consists of such invertebrates as clams and polychaete worms. As well as burrowing, it can swim well, undulating its body up and down, and sometimes rotating as it does so. As it travels it often lifts its head above the surface of the water. It may be brought to the surface in sediment dredged up from the seabed and has a habit of disintegrating if it is handled. It is sometimes caught with rod and line using live mussels as bait.

The sexes are separate and breeding takes place in summer. The larvae have been used in embryological research.
