= Lineus sanguineus =

Scientific classification
- Kingdom: Animalia
- Phylum: Nemertea
- Class: Pilidiophora
- Order: Heteronemertea
- Family: Lineidae
- Genus: Lineus
- Species: L. sanguineus

Binomial name
- Lineus sanguineus (Rathke, 1799)

Synonyms
- Lineus communis; Lineus nigricans Bürger, 1893; Lineus nigricnus; Lineus ruber; Lineus socialis (Leidy, 1855); Lineus vegetus Coe, 1931; Myoisophagos sanguineus (Rathke, 1799); Nemertes sanguinea; Nemertes socialis Leidy, 1855; Planaria sanguinea Rathke, 1799; Ramphogordius sanguineus (Rathke, 1799)

Species of ribbon worm

Lineus sanguineus, the banded nemertean or social lineus, is a species of nemertean ribbon worm in the family Lineidae. It occurs in the northeastern Atlantic Ocean as well as on both coasts of North America. It burrows in muddy sand from the mid-tidal zone downwards and conceals itself in crevices and under stones.

== Description ==
Lineus sanguineus is an elongate worm with a slender body growing to a length of about 20 cm (8 in). The head has the eversible proboscis typical of nemertean worms and four to six eyes on either side. In colour it varies from a bright reddish-brown to a more sombre medium brown, sometimes with up to twenty narrow paler bands, and the ventral part and the posterior portion are often paler than the rest of the body. It is very similar in appearance to Lineus ruber, but the eyes are set further back on the head and are more neatly arranged. Unlike L. ruber, when disturbed it coils up into a tangled ball, whereas L. ruber merely contracts, becoming shorter and stouter in the process.

== Distribution and habitat ==
L. sanguineus occurs on the coasts of northwestern Europe, its range extending from Sweden southwards through the North Sea to the British Isles, Belgium and France. It is also recorded in North America, including in the Bay of Fundy, in Brandy Cove, in the Digdeguash Estuary and in the Gulf of Maine, as well as the Pacific coast. It is typically found burrowing in muddy sand, including blackish sediment with a high content of organic matter, under stones and rocks, in crevices and among coralline algae in the intertidal zone, from mid-beach downwards. There is some uncertainty about the precise range because of the lack of exact identification of specimens, especially those collected several decades ago.

== Biology ==
This ribbon worm is a detritivore and grazer. It is rather fragile, and any attempt to collect it is likely to end with the worm breaking in pieces. However, it is able to regenerate itself from any fragment that is at least half as long as the worm's diameter; each piece can develop into a complete new worm in three to four weeks. In fact this appears to be a form of asexual reproduction, the worm dividing along pre-arranged fracture lines; tiny pieces may form cysts, with the new worms developing inside these.
