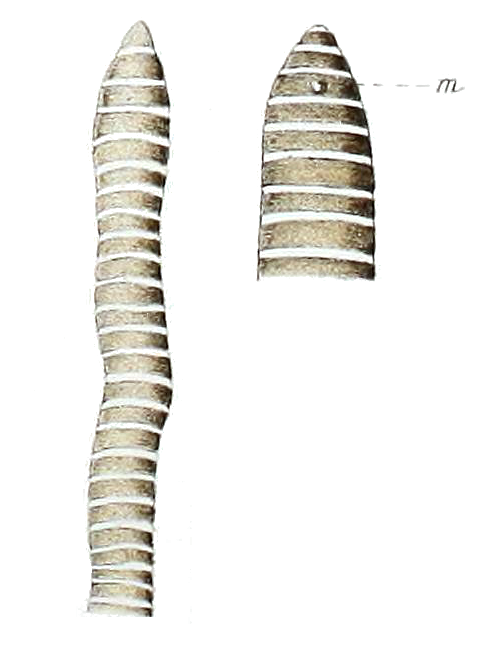

Scientific classification
- Domain: Eukaryota
- Kingdom: Animalia
- Phylum: Nemertea
- Class: Pilidiophora
- Order: Heteronemertea
- Family: Valenciniidae
- Genus: Baseodiscus
- Species: B. mexicanus

Binomial name
- Baseodiscus mexicanus (Bürger, 1893)

Synonyms
- Baseodiscus mexicanum Eupolia mexicana Taeniosoma mexicana Toeniosoma mexicana

= Baseodiscus mexicanus =

Species of ribbon worm

Baseodiscus mexicanus is a species of proboscis worm in the family Valenciniidae.

== Description ==
This species commonly grows 1 to 2 metres long and 5 to 7 mm wide. It does not contract significantly when physically contacted or killed. When it does actually contract strongly, it has a flattened appearance, being widest immediately behind the back of the head. The part of the body containing the intestines is flat and broad. The posterior is very thin.

== Distribution ==
Baseodiscus mexicanus is found in abundance on the Pacific east coast in the waters of Panama and Mexico, as well as in the Galapagos Islands. It has been found nowhere else.
