= Zygeupolia rufa =

Scientific classification
- Domain: Eukaryota
- Kingdom: Animalia
- Phylum: Nemertea
- Class: Pilidiophora
- Order: Heteronemertea
- Family: Lineidae
- Genus: Zygeupolia
- Species: Z. rufa

Binomial name
- Zygeupolia rufa (Punnett, 1901)

Synonyms
- Micrella rufa Punnett, 1901

Species of ribbon worm

Zygeupolia rufa is a species of ribbon worm within the family Lineidae. Its distribution is in the English Channel in benthic environments. Individuals can reach up to 5000 millimeters in length.
