= Sulcus spiralis =

Sulcus spiralis may refer to:

- Sulcus spiralis externus
- Sulcus spiralis internus
