= Pussylineidae =

Scientific classification
- Domain: Eukaryota
- Kingdom: Animalia
- Phylum: Nemertea
- Class: Pilidiophora
- Order: Heteronemertea
- Family: Pussylineidae

Family of ribbon worms

Pussylineidae is a family of nemerteans belonging to the order Heteronemertea.

Genera:

- Lineopsella Friedrich, 1970
- Pussylineus
