= Apatronemertes =

Scientific classification
- Domain: Eukaryota
- Kingdom: Animalia
- Phylum: Nemertea
- Class: Pilidiophora
- Order: Heteronemertea
- Family: Lineidae
- Genus: Apatronemertes; Wilfert & Gibson, 1974

Genus of worms

Apatronemertes is a genus of nemertean worms belonging to the family Lineidae.

The species of this genus are found in America and Japan.

Species:

- Apatronemertes albimaculosa Wilfert & Gibson, 1974
