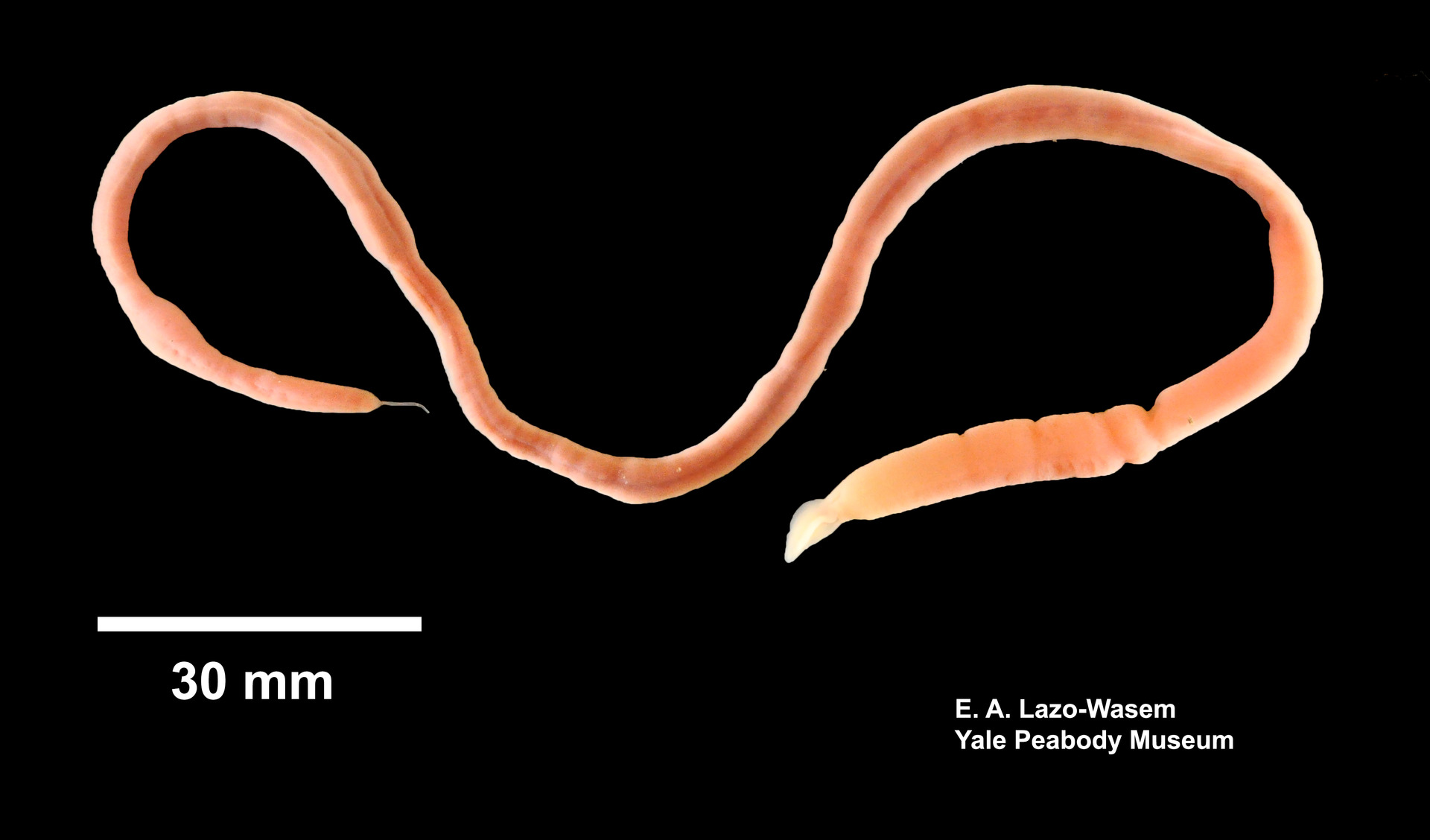

Scientific classification
- Domain: Eukaryota
- Kingdom: Animalia
- Phylum: Nemertea
- Class: Pilidiophora
- Order: Heteronemertea
- Family: Lineidae
- Genus: Cerebratulus
- Species: C. lacteus

Binomial name
- Cerebratulus lacteus (Leidy, 1851)

Synonyms
- Cerebratulus acteus; Cerebratulus ingens; Meckelia ingens; Meckelia lactea Leidy, 1851; Meckelia lizziae; Meckelia pocohontas; Micrura lactea (Hubrecht)

= Cerebratulus lacteus =

Species of ribbon worm

Cerebratulus lacteus, the milky nemertean or milky ribbon worm, is a proboscis worm in the family Lineidae. This ribbon worm has a wide geographical range on both sides of the northern Atlantic Ocean.

== Description ==
Cerebratulus lacteus grows to a length of about 120 cm (4 ft) and a width of 22 mm (0.9 in). The head is rounded and flattened, with a pair of cerebral organs and cephalic grooves, but no eyes. The head is not readily distinguishable from the body, which is flattened and gradually tapers towards the tail, where there is a slender caudal cirrus. This worm is usually milky-white in colour but may be pink.

== Ecology ==
Cerebratulus lacteus burrows in muddy sediments into which it can burrow rapidly. It is a voracious predator and has been observed attacking bivalve molluscs and crustaceans. The proboscis is everted (turned inside out) and the lower half of the Atlantic jackknife clam (Ensis directus) is enveloped. In an effort to escape, the clam works its way out of the sediment and may then be at risk of predation by birds. Soft clams, such as Mya arenaria are also attacked. In this case, the ribbonworm inserts the tip of its proboscis through the siphon and consumes the soft tissues. It is not clear whether the ribbonworm preys on hard clams, but a high abundance of this worm at one location near Prince Edward Island was thought to be responsible for the high mortality among newly transplanted hard clams.

As is the case with other nemertean worms, the sexes are separate in this species and fertilisation is external. Reproduction can also occur by fragmentation, as this worm readily breaks into pieces which can grow into new organisms.

== Research ==
Cerebratulus lacteus produces several homologous polypeptide cytotoxins that are active in breaking down the membranes of human red blood cells, as well as several neurotoxins. These substances are being researched.

Clams have been identified as a useful subject for aquaculture in Canada. Because Cerebratulus lacteus is a threat to such activities, research is ongoing into the ribbonworm and what governs its patchy distribution, with a view to being able to better control it.
