= Nemertoscolex =

Scientific classification
- Domain: Eukaryota
- Kingdom: Animalia
- Phylum: Nemertea
- Class: Pilidiophora
- Order: Heteronemertea
- Family: Lineidae
- Genus: Nemertoscolex; Greeff, 1879

Genus of worms

Nemertoscolex is a genus of ribbon worms belonging to the family Lineidae.

The species of this genus are found in Northern Europe.

Species:

- Nemertoscolex parasiticus Greeff, 1879
