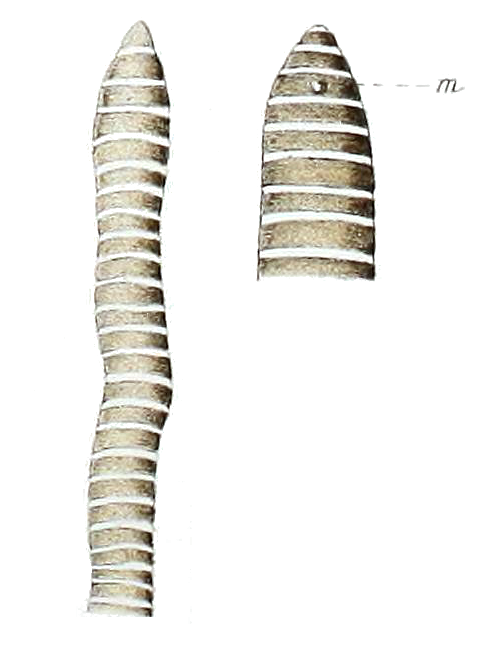
- Baseodiscus mexicanus

Scientific classification
- Kingdom: Animalia
- Phylum: Nemertea
- Class: Pilidiophora
- Order: Heteronemertea
- Family: Baseodiscidae

= Baseodiscidae =

Family of ribbon worms

Baseodiscidae is a family of worms belonging to the order Heteronemertea.

Genera:

- Baseodiscus
- Oxypolia Punnett, 1901
