= Euborlasia =

Scientific classification
- Kingdom: Animalia
- Phylum: Nemertea
- Class: Pilidiophora
- Order: Heteronemertea
- Family: Lineidae
- Genus: Euborlasia; Vaillant, 1890

Genus of ribbon worms

Euborlasia is a genus of worms belonging to the family Lineidae.

The species of this genus are found in Europe, North America.

Species:

- Euborlasia elizabethae (McIntosh, 1873-1874)
- Euborlasia gotoensis Iwata, 1952
- Euborlasia hancocki Coe, 1940
- Euborlasia inmaculata (Bürger, 1892)
- Euborlasia maxima Coe, 1905
- Euborlasia maycoli Hookabe & Kajihara, 2020
- Euborlasia nigrocincta Coe, 1940
- Euborlasia obscura (Friedrich, 1958)
- Euborlasia proteres Iwata, 1957
- Euborlasia thori Friedrich, 1958
- Euborlasia variegata Coe, 1944
