= Colemaniella =

Colemaniella may refer to:

- Colemaniella (worm), a genus of worms in the family Lineidae
- Colemaniella (fungus), a genus of fungi in the division Ascomycota, order and family unassigned
