= Utolineides =

Scientific classification
- Domain: Eukaryota
- Kingdom: Animalia
- Phylum: Nemertea
- Class: Pilidiophora
- Order: Heteronemertea
- Family: Lineidae
- Genus: Utolineides; Senz, 1997

Genus of ribbon worms

Utolineides is a genus of nemerteans belonging to the family Lineidae.

Species:

- Utolineides alba Senz, 1997
- Utolineides kenneli Senz, 2001
