= Lineopsis =

Scientific classification
- Kingdom: Animalia
- Phylum: Nemertea
- Class: Pilidiophora
- Order: Heteronemertea
- Family: Lineidae
- Genus: Lineopsis; Staub, 1900
- Species: L. semonii

Binomial name
- Lineopsis semonii Staub, 1900

Genus of ribbon worms

Lineopsis is a monotypic genus of nemerteans belonging to the family Lineidae. The only species is Lineopsis semonii.
