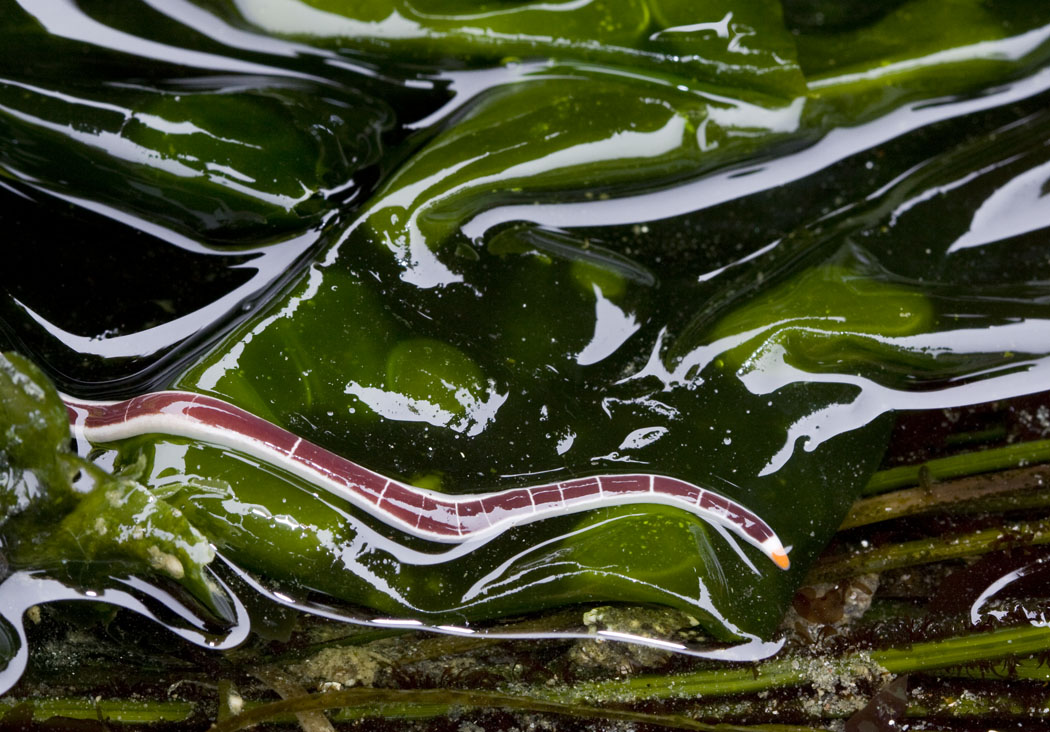
- Micrura verrilli

Scientific classification
- Kingdom: Animalia
- Phylum: Nemertea
- Class: Pilidiophora
- Order: Heteronemertea
- Family: Lineidae
- Genus: Micrura; Ehrenberg, 1828

Type species
- Micrura fasciolata Ehrenberg, 1828

Species
- See text

Synonyms
- Alardus Busch, 1851; Stylus Johnston, 1865

= Micrura =

Genus of ribbon worms

Micrura is a genus of nemerteans belonging to the family Lineidae.

The genus has almost cosmopolitan distribution.

== Species ==
The following species are recognised in the genus Micrura:

- M. achrostocephala Gibson, 1997
- M. affinis (Girard in Stimpson, 1854)
- M. akkeshiensis Yamaoka, 1940
- M. albida Verrill, 1879
- M. albifrons Timofeev, 1911
- M. ambigua Friedrich, 1958
- M. atra Punnett, 1903
- M. baltica Cantell, 1975
- M. bathyalis Chernyshev, 2013
- M. bella (Stimpson, 1857)
- M. bergenicola Punnett, 1903
- M. caeca Verrill, 1895
- M. callima Sundberg & Gibson, 1995
- M. candida Bürger, 1892
- M. ceylanica (Schmarda, 1859)
- M. chlorapardalis Schwartz & Norenburg, 2005
- M. coei Gibson, 1995
- M. corallifila Cantell, 1975
- M. curacaoensis Stiasny-Wijnhoff, 1925
- M. dorsalis Verrill, 1892
- M. dorsovittata Takakura, 1898
- M. elegans Senz, 1993
- M. fasciolata Ehrenberg, 1828
- M. filaris (Müller, 1780)
- M. follini Joubin, 1902
- M. impressa (Stimpson, 1857)
- M. kulikovae Chernyshev, 1992
- M. leidyi (Verrill, 1892)
- M. lithotamnii Ushakov, 1928
- M. magna Yamaoka, 1940
- M. multinotara Iwata, 1957
- M. nebulosa Coe, 1905
- M. nigrirostris Coe, 1904
- M. olivaris Coe, 1905
- M. pacifica Friedrich, 1970
- M. pardalis Haddon, 1886
- M. pleuropolia Cantell, 1994
- M. pseudovaricolor Senz, 1993
- M. purpurea (Dalyell, 1853)
- M. rockalliensis Dollfus, 1924
- M. rovinjensis Senz, 1993
- M. rubra Verrill, 1892
- M. rubramaculosa Schwartz & Norenburg, 2005
- M. scotica Stephenson, 1911
- M. trigonocephala (Schmarda, 1859)
- M. tristis (Hubrecht, 1879)
- M. vanderhorsti Stiasny-Wijnhoff, 1925
- M. varicolor Punnett, 1903
- M. verrilli Coe, 1901
- M. wilsoni (Coe, 1904)
