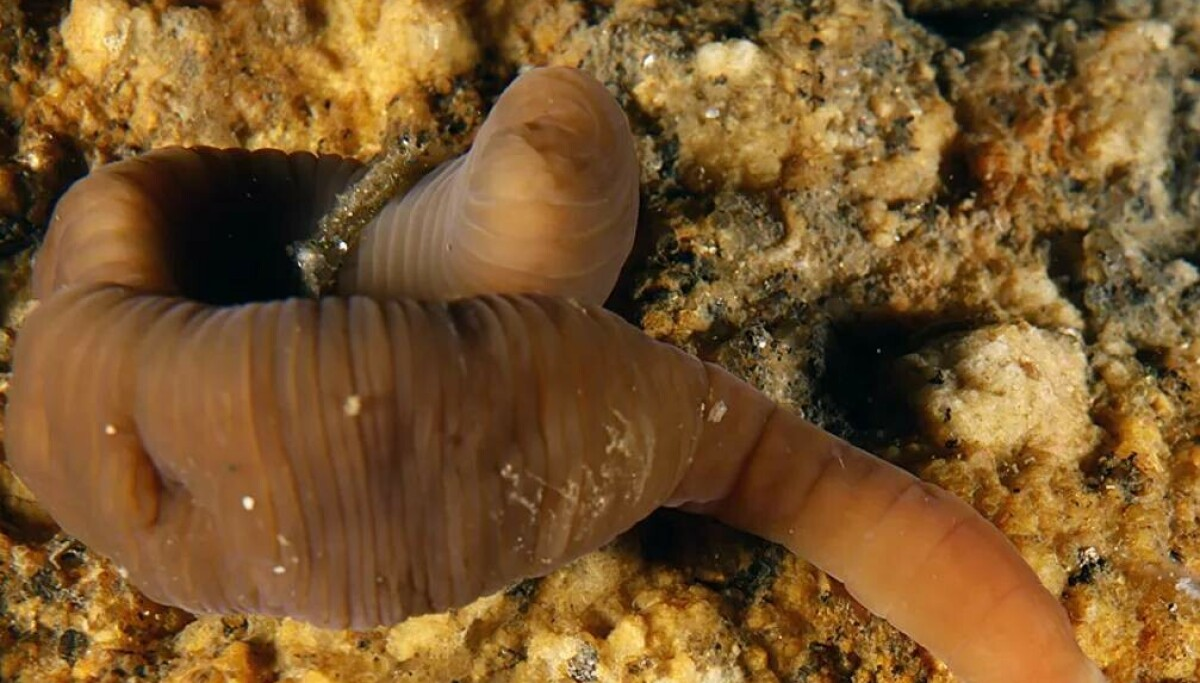

Scientific classification
- Kingdom: Animalia
- Phylum: Nemertea
- Class: Pilidiophora
- Order: Heteronemertea
- Family: Lineidae
- Genus: Pararosa; Junoy & Verdes, 2025
- Species: P. vigarae

Binomial name
- Pararosa vigarae Junoy & Verdes, 2025

= Pararosa =

Genus and species of ribbon worm

Pararosa vigarae, the only known species in the genus Pararosa, is a species of ribbon worm in the family Lineidae that was discovered off the coast of Galicia, Spain, in the Ría de Arousa estuary. It is nicknamed the "accordion worm" because it can contract its body into ring-like folds like an accordion's bellows. The discovery was confirmed using both external features and molecular genetic analysis.
