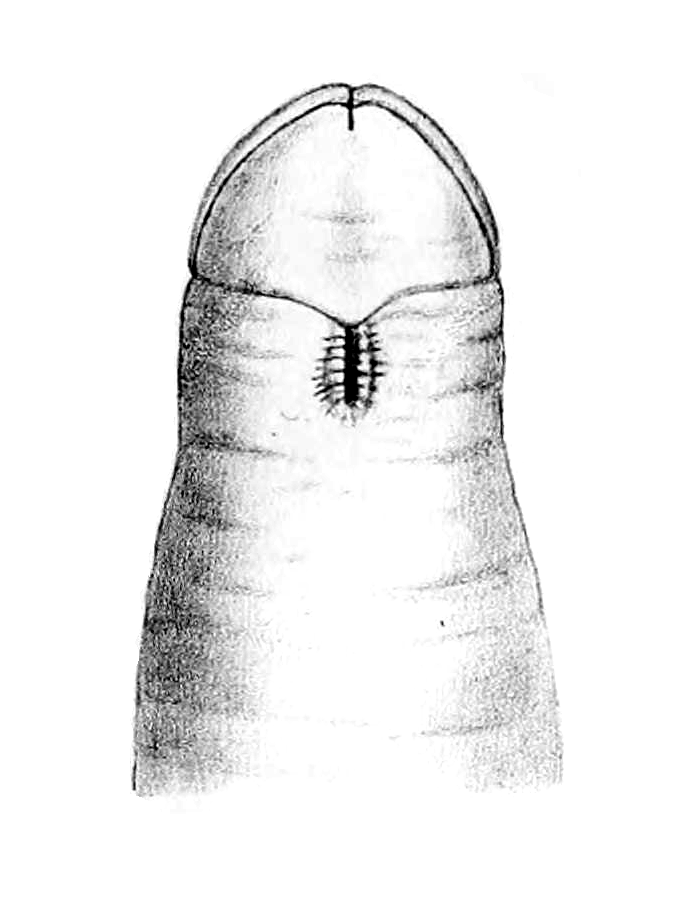
- Head of Antarctolineus scotti

Scientific classification
- Domain: Eukaryota
- Kingdom: Animalia
- Phylum: Nemertea
- Class: Pilidiophora
- Order: Heteronemertea
- Family: Lineidae
- Genus: Antarctolineus; Müller & Scripcariu, 1964
- Species: A. scotti

Binomial name
- Antarctolineus scotti (Baylis, 1915)

= Antarctolineus =

Genus of ribbon worms

Antarctolineus is a monotypic genus of worms belonging to the family Lineidae. The only species is Antarctolineus scotti.

The species is found in near Antarctica.
