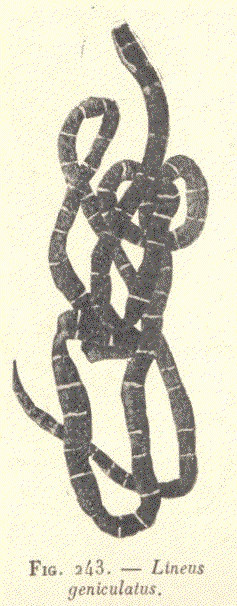
- Notospermus geniculatus

Scientific classification
- Kingdom: Animalia
- Phylum: Nemertea
- Class: Pilidiophora
- Order: Heteronemertea
- Family: Lineidae
- Genus: Notospermus; Huschke, 1829

= Notospermus =

Genus of ribbon worms

Notospermus is a genus of nemertine worms that includes marine species. Genus contains the following species:

- Notospermus albovittatus Stimpson, 1855
- Notospermus geniculatus Delle Chiaje, 1828
- Notospermus tricuspidatus Quoy & Gaimard, 1833
