= Neurotoxin B-IV =

Toxic protein

Neurotoxin B-IV is a venom peptide secreted by a large marine worm called Cerebratulus lacteus that inhabits the northeastern coast of North America. This neurotoxin belongs to a major type of B polypeptide neurotoxins, which appear to be selectively toxic for crustaceans. The mode of action for neurotoxin B-IV has not been clearly established. However, it is likely that B neurotoxins prolong the repolarization phase of action potentials by interacting with voltage-gated sodium channels.

== Etymology and Source ==
Neurotoxin B-IV is found in the mucus secretions of the Atlantic coast marine worm Cerebratulus lacteus. Cerebratulus lacteus produces two major types of polypeptide neurotoxins namely A and B. Toxins B include four neurotoxins designated B-I to B-IV.

== Chemistry ==
=== Structure ===
Neurotoxin B-IV has a helical structure that looks like a hairpin, and consists of 55 amino acid residues, cross-linked by four disulfide bonds. Its molecular size is about 6000 Dalton. The sequence of the neurotoxin B-IV is ASATWGAAYPACENNCRKKYDLCIRCQGKWAGKRGKCAAHCIIQKNNCKGKCKKE.

=== Homology ===
The complete structures for two of the four B toxins (B-II and B-IV) have been determined. Toxin B-II differs from B-IV in that the secondary structure of Toxin B-II contains about 15-20% less α-helixes than B-IV due to the differences in the primary structure of the two proteins; amino acids Ala in position 3, Ala in position 7 and Ala in position 8 in B-IV are substituted by amino acids Ser, Gly and Ser in B-II respectively.

No homology is displayed with other sodium channel selective toxins, such as scorpion and sea anemone venom toxins, despite being similar in size, basicity, and degree of cross-linking. The secondary structures of scorpion and anemone toxins are largely organized into β-sheet conformations, while the secondary structures of B toxins organize in α-helical conformations.

=== Family ===
Neurotoxin B-IV belongs to a family of four homologous polypeptide neurotoxins designated B-I to B-IV which are produced by the marine worm Cerebratulus lacteus.

== Target ==
Neurotoxin B-IV displays a high affinity binding to a single class of receptor sites on crustacean axon membrane vesicles. B-IV binds to a nerve membrane protein in crustaceans which is similar in size to the β-subunit of sodium channels in nerve and muscle of mammals. The binding site for toxin B-IV is distinct from sodium channel site III, which is targeted by both scorpion and sea anemone toxins.

== Mode of Action ==
Neurotoxin B-IV appears to prolong the repolarization phase of the action potential in crustacean nerve sodium channels but does not affect the initial opening of these channels. It is likely that this neurotoxin causes a small depolarization of the resting potential in lobster and crayfish walking leg nerve.

Cationic residues are important determinants for polypeptide neurotoxins' function. Specifically, the arginine residues, located within the N-terminal helix, seem to be essential for the activity of neurotoxin B-IV and are most likely directly involved in binding.

== Toxicity ==
Neurotoxin B-IV is selectively toxic to crustaceans inducing paralysis, at mean concentrations of about 20 ng/g of body weight. This neurotoxin is the most abundant of the B neurotoxin family and 15-20-fold less toxic than neurotoxin B-II.
