= Leucocephalonemertes =

Scientific classification
- Kingdom: Animalia
- Phylum: Nemertea
- Class: Pilidiophora
- Order: Heteronemertea
- Family: Lineidae
- Genus: Leucocephalonemertes; Cantell, 1996
- Species: L. aurantiaca

Binomial name
- Leucocephalonemertes aurantiaca (Grube, 1855)

Synonyms
- Micrura aurantiaca; Meckelia aurantiaca

Genus of ribbon worms

Leucocephalonemertes is a monotypic genus of ribbon worms belonging to the family Lineidae. The only species is Leucocephalonemertes aurantiaca.

== Etymology ==
The genus name, Leucocephalonemertes, comes from the Greek leucos, meaning white, kephalos, meaning head, and Nemertes, from which the phylum name (Nemertea) is also derived.

The species epithet, aurantiaca, comes from the modern Latin aurantium, meaning orange.

== Distribution ==
The species is found in Western Europe; specifically, it has been recorded from the UK, Norway, Italy, France, and Cabrera, Spain.

== Description ==
The worms typically grow from 6 to 10 centimetres (2.4 to 3.9 in) long, and 0.15 to 0.3 centimetres (0.059 to 0.118 in) across.
