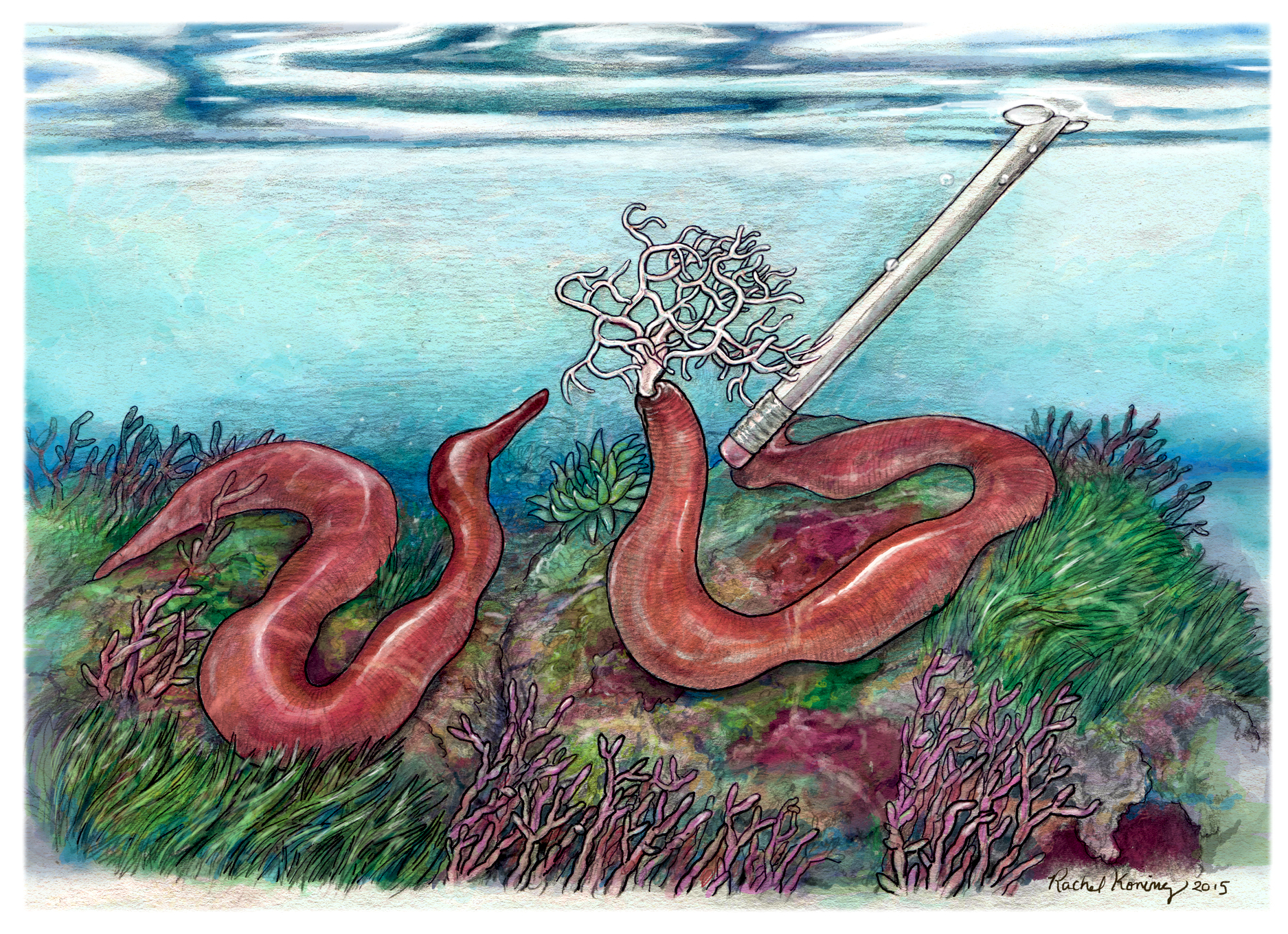
- Gorgonorhynchus repens discharging a sticky proboscis

Scientific classification
- Kingdom: Animalia
- Phylum: Nemertea
- Class: Pilidiophora
- Order: Heteronemertea
- Family: Gorgonorhynchidae
- Genus: Gorgonorhynchus
- Species: G. repens

Binomial name
- Gorgonorhynchus repens Dakin & Fordham, 1931

= Gorgonorhynchus repens =

Species of ribbon worm

Gorgonorhynchus repens is a species of the proboscis worm in the subclass Heteronemertea and of the family Gorgonorhynchidae. It is to be found on the seabed in shallow water in the Pacific Ocean.

== Description ==
G. repens is orange in color and grows to an unstretched length of about 50 mm (2 in). It is cylindrical in shape with bluntly tapering ends. Proboscis worms are known for their reversible proboscides, but in most species these are unbranched and cylindrical, or may have a sharp, venomous stylet part way to the tip. In a few instances, they are branched but the side branches are short and the proboscis resembles a feather. In the case of G. repens, the proboscis is a densely branching structure giving the impression of a cloud of mucus secretion.

== Distribution and habitat ==
G. repens is native to the Pacific Ocean where it is found in shallow water on the seabed, living on the surface or tunnelling through soft sediment.

== Ecology ==
Proboscis worms in general are predatory, snaring or spearing their prey. At first, zoologists were unclear precisely how this species fed; the branched proboscis resembles the feeding tentacles of sea cucumbers in the family Synaptidae, which feed by sifting through sediment, and might have the same function; alternatively, the proboscis might function like the cirri in the oral hood of the lion nudibranch (Melibe leonina) which feeds by filtering zooplankton out of the water. It is now accepted that the branched proboscis is shot out like a sticky harpoon and snares animals such as molluscs and other worms. It is then reeled in, dragging the prey back to the mouth, where it is swallowed whole. The proboscis is also used defensively if the proboscis worm is stressed.

Gorgonorhynchus repens discharging a sticky proboscis
