= Hubrechtella =

Scientific classification
- Domain: Eukaryota
- Kingdom: Animalia
- Phylum: Nemertea
- Class: Pilidiophora
- Order: Hubrechtiiformes
- Family: Hubrechtellidae; Chernyshev, 2003
- Genus: Hubrechtella; Bergendal, 1902

Type species
- Hubrechtella dubia Bergendal, 1902

Species
- See text

Synonyms
- Coeia

Genus of worms

Hubrechtella is a genus of nemerteans belonging to the monotypic family Hubrechtellidae.

Species:

- Hubrechtella alba Gibson, 1997
- Hubrechtella atypica Senz, 1992
- Hubrechtella combinata Senz, 1993
- Hubrechtella dubia Bergendal, 1902
- Hubrechtella ehrenbergi Senz, 2000
- Hubrechtella globocystica Senz, 1993
- Hubrechtella ijimai Takakura, 1922
- Hubrechtella indica Kirsteuer, 1967
- Hubrechtella juliae Chernyshev, 2003
- Hubrechtella kimuraorum Kajihara, 2006
- Hubrechtella malabarensis Gibson, 1979
- Hubrechtella queenslandica Gibson, 1979
- Hubrechtella sarodravayensis Kirsteuer, 1967
- Hubrechtella sinimarina Gibson & Sundberg, 1999
