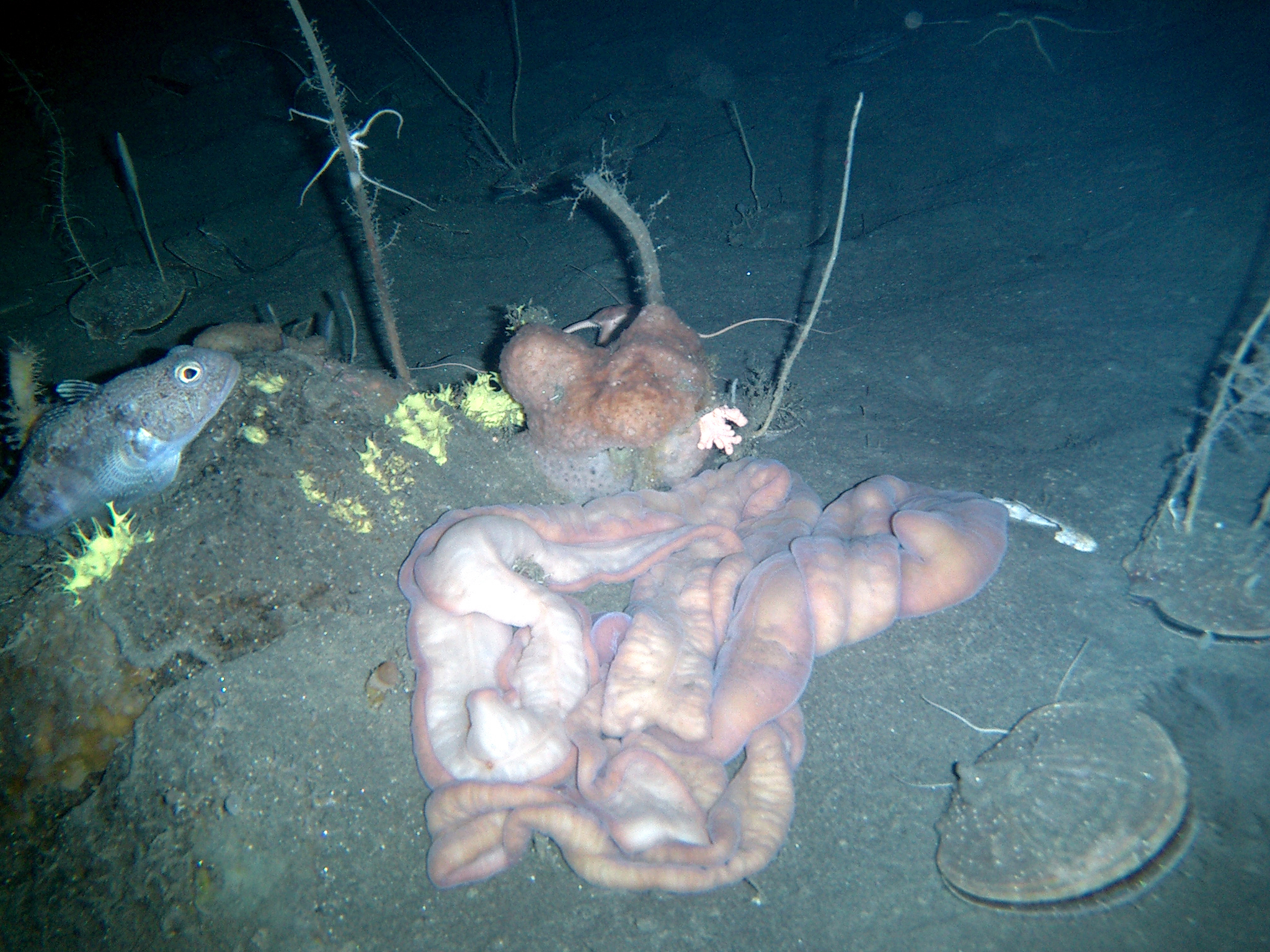
- Parborlasia corrugata from the Ross Sea

Scientific classification
- Kingdom: Animalia
- Phylum: Nemertea
- Class: Pilidiophora
- Order: Heteronemertea
- Family: Lineidae
- Genus: Parborlasia
- Species: P. corrugata

Binomial name
- Parborlasia corrugata (McIntosh, 1876)

Synonyms
- Cerebratulus charcoti Cerebratulus corrugatus Cerebratulus hanseni Cerebratulus magelhaensicus Cerebratulus steeneni Cerebratulus steineni Cerebratulus steinini Cerebratulus subtilis Lineus corrugatus Parborlasia corrugatus

= Parborlasia corrugata =

Species of ribbon worm

Parborlasia corrugata is a proboscis worm in the family Lineidae. It was formerly placed in family Cerebratulidae. This species of proboscis or ribbon worm can grow to 2 metres (6 ft 7 in) in length, and lives in marine environments down to 3,590 metres (11,780 ft). This scavenger and predator is widely distributed in the cold Southern Ocean.

== Description ==
Parborlasia corrugata is smooth and flat. Adults measure 1–2 metres (3 ft 3 in – 6 ft 7 in), with a diameter of approximately 2 cm (0.79 in). Specimens can weigh up to 140 grams (4.9 oz). Their colouration is variable, ranging from cream through various tones of black. This worm has a wedge-shaped head containing a cavity filled with fluid. It uses this to fire an adhesive, barbed proboscis as a means of defense, and to capture prey. This organ has adhesive secretion to aid in securing its meal.

Body wall structure (after McIntosh, 1876)

Although this creature does not have a dedicated respiratory system, Parborlasia corrugata is able to obtain oxygen by absorbing it through its skin. An animal of its size would typically find it difficult to receive enough oxygen this way, but this worm has a low metabolic rate, and also enjoys the advantage of its environment, which is cold, oxygen-rich Antarctic waters. When Parborlasia corrugata experiences lower levels of oxygen in the water, it flattens and elongates its body to aid in the uptake of oxygen by increasing its skin area. This manoeuvre also reduces the distance that the oxygen must travel to diffuse into its body.

Potential predators avoid this species as it has a chemical defense: acidic mucus with a pH 3.5.

== Distribution ==
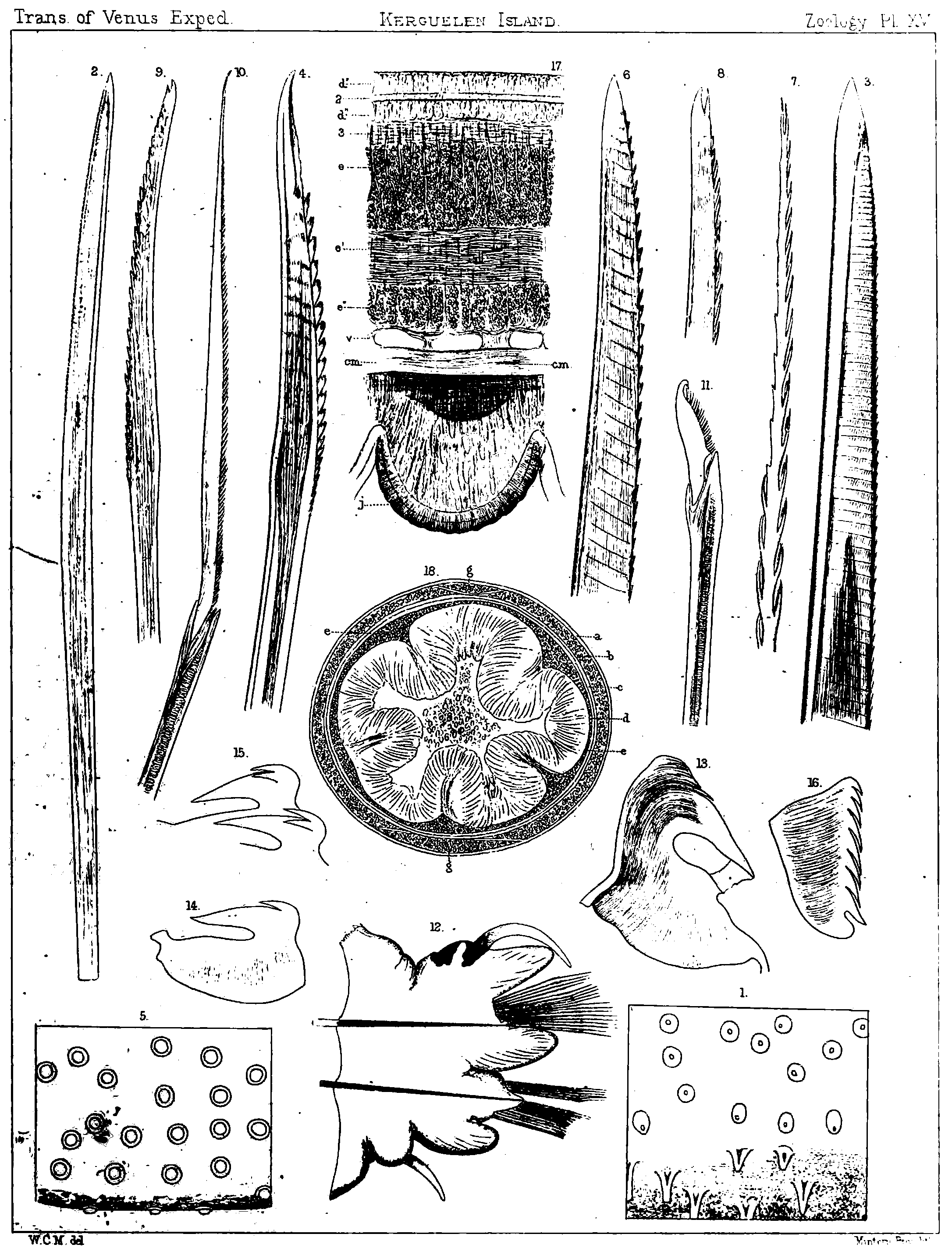
Anatomy of Parborlasia corrugata (fig. 17 and 18 only)

This species is found from the intertidal zone to depths of up to 3,590 metres (11,780 ft). It is found throughout the following areas:

- Antarctica
- Antarctic Peninsula
- south Atlantic Ocean
- South Shetland Islands (62°00′S 58°00′W)
- South Orkney Islands (60°35′S 45°30′W)
- South Sandwich Islands (57°45′S 26°30′W)
- South Georgia Island (54°15′S 36°45′W)
- Bouvet Island (54°26′S 03°24′E)
- Kerguelen Island (49°15′S 69°35′E)
- Cargados Carajos Shoals in the Indian Ocean
- Falkland Islands
- Tierra del Fuego (54°00′S 70°00′W)
- southern Argentina
- Peru
- Chile

Densities range greatly from 0.3 m^{−2} recorded in McMurdo Sound, to the substantially higher density of 26.2 m^{−2} around Signy Island.

== Reproduction ==
This dioecious species broadcast spawns. The resulting pilidium larvae survive in the water column for up to 150 days.

== Diet ==
Parborlasia corrugata is both a scavenger and a predator, and feeds upon detritus diatoms, gastropods, amphipods, isopods, various vertebrate carrion, sponges (including Homaxinella balfourensis), jellyfish, seastars, molluscs, anemones, and polychaete worms.
