= Valencinia =

Scientific classification
- Kingdom: Animalia
- Phylum: Nemertea
- Class: Pilidiophora
- Order: Heteronemertea
- Family: Valenciniidae
- Genus: Valencinia; Quatrefages, 1846

Genus of ribbon worms

Valencinia is a genus of worms belonging to the family Valenciniidae.

The species of this genus are found in United Kingdom.

Species:

- Valencinia blanca Bürger, 1892
- Valencinia dubia Quatrefages, 1846
- Valencinia lineformis McIntosh, 1874
- Valencinia longirostris Quatrefages, 1846
