= Diplopleura =

Scientific classification
- Domain: Eukaryota
- Kingdom: Animalia
- Phylum: Nemertea
- Class: Pilidiophora
- Order: Heteronemertea
- Family: Lineidae
- Genus: Diplopleura; Stimpson, 1857

Genus of worms

Diplopleura is a genus of nemerteans belonging to the family Lineidae.

Species:

- Diplopleura curacaoensis Stiasny-Wijnhoff, 1925
- Diplopleura formosa (Hubrecht, 1879)
- Diplopleura japonica Stimpson, 1857
- Diplopleura obockiana (Joubin, 1887)
- Diplopleura vivesi (Joubin, 1905)
