= Riseriellus =

Scientific classification
- Kingdom: Animalia
- Phylum: Nemertea
- Class: Pilidiophora
- Order: Heteronemertea
- Family: Lineidae
- Genus: Riseriellus; Rogers, Junoy, Gibson & Thorpe, 1993
- Species: R. occultus

Binomial name
- Riseriellus occultus Rogers, Junoy, Gibson & Thorpe, 1993

Genus of nemerteans

Riseriellus is a monotypic genus of nemerteans belonging to the family Lineidae. The only species is Riseriellus occultus.

The species is found in Northwestern Europe.
