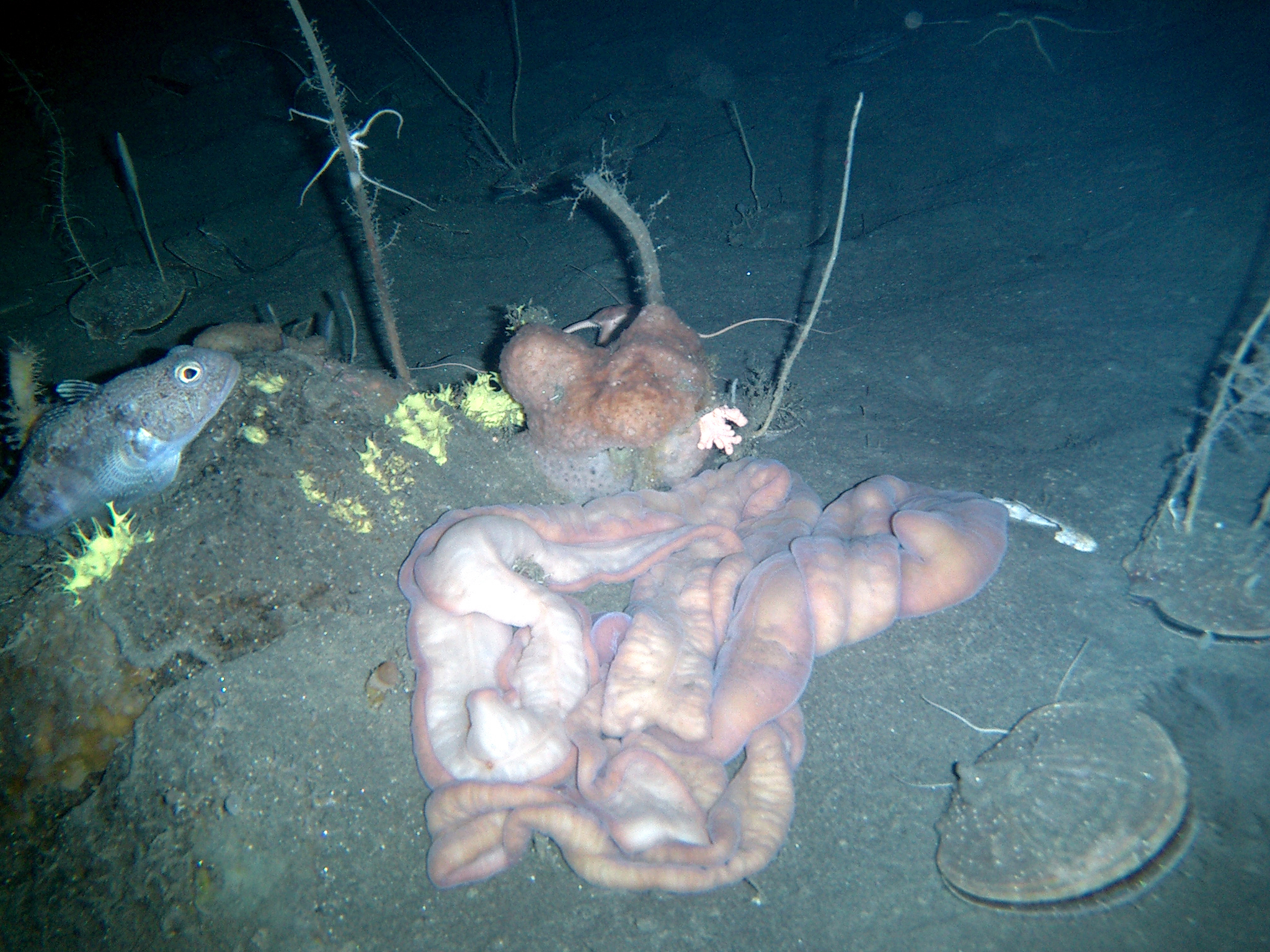
- Parborlasia corrugatus

Scientific classification
- Kingdom: Animalia
- Phylum: Nemertea
- Class: Pilidiophora
- Order: Heteronemertea
- Family: Lineidae
- Genus: Parborlasia; Friedrich, 1970

= Parborlasia =

Genus of ribbon worms

Parborlasia is a genus of nemerteans belonging to the family Lineidae.

The species of this genus are found in southernmost South Hemisphere.

Species:

- Parborlasia corrugatus (McIntosh, 1876)
- Parborlasia dahli Friedrich, 1970
- Parborlasia fueguina Serna de Esteban & Moretto, 1968
- Parborlasia hutchingsae Gibson, 1978
- Parborlasia landrumae Gibson, 1985
