= Micrella =

Micrella may refer to:

- Micrella, a genus of gastropods in the family Pneumodermatidae, synonym of Pneumoderma
- Micrella, a genus of beetles in the family Ptiliidae, synonym of Ptilium
- Micrella, a genus of nemerteans in the family Lineidae, synonym of Zygeupolia
