= Colemaniella albulus =

Scientific classification
- Domain: Eukaryota
- Kingdom: Animalia
- Phylum: Nemertea
- Class: Pilidiophora
- Order: Heteronemertea
- Family: Lineidae
- Genus: Colemaniella; Gibson, 1982
- Species: C. albulus

Binomial name
- Colemaniella albulus (Gibson, 1981)

Species of ribbon worm

Colemaniella is a monotypic genus of worms belonging to the family Lineidae. The only species is Colemaniella albulus.

The species is found in Australia.
