= Polydendrorhynchus =

Scientific classification
- Kingdom: Animalia
- Phylum: Nemertea
- Class: Pilidiophora
- Order: Heteronemertea
- Family: Polybrachiorhynchidae
- Genus: Polydendrorhynchus; Yin & Zeng, 1986
- Species: P. zhanjiangensis

Binomial name
- Polydendrorhynchus zhanjiangensis (Yin & Zeng, 1984)

Synonyms
- Dendrorhynchus Yin & Zeng, 1984

Genus of ribbon worms

Polydendrorhynchus is a monotypic genus of nemerteans belonging to the family Polybrachiorhynchidae. The only species is Polydendrorhynchus zhanjiangensis.
