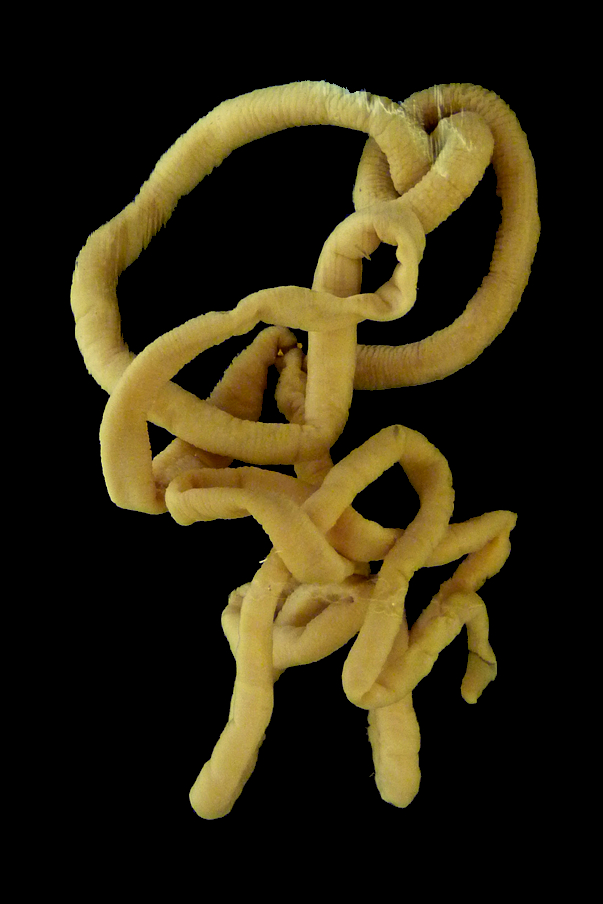
- Lineus longissimus

Scientific classification
- Kingdom: Animalia
- Phylum: Nemertea
- Class: Pilidiophora
- Order: Heteronemertea
- Family: Lineidae
- Genus: Lineus; Sowerby, 1806

Synonyms
- Nemertes Cuvier, 1817

= Lineus =

Genus of ribbon worms

Lineus is a genus of nemertine worms, including the bootlace worm, arguably the longest animal alive. Lineus contains the following species:

- Lineus acutifrons Southern, 1913
- Lineus albifrons Coe, 1934
- Lineus albocinctus Verrill, 1900
- Lineus albonasus Verrill, 1900
- Lineus alborostratus Takakura, 1898
- Lineus albus
- Lineus alienus Bürger, 1895
- Lineus anellatus
- Lineus angulosus Korotkevich, 1978
- Lineus arenicola (Verrill, 1873)
- Lineus atradentis Korotkevich, 1978
- Lineus atrocaeruleus (Schmarda, 1859)
- Lineus auripunctatus (Grube, 1855)
- Lineus aurostriatus (Bürger, 1890)
- Lineus australis
- Lineus autrani Joubin, 1905
- Lineus bergendali Senz, 1996
- Lineus bilineatus (Renier, 1804)
- Lineus binigrilinearis Gibson, 1990
- Lineus bioculatus Sundberg & Gibson, 1995
- Lineus bipunctatus Takakura, 1898
- Lineus bonaerensis Moretto, 1971
- Lineus boutani (Joubin, 1893)
- Lineus callaris Korotkevich, 1978
- Lineus cancelli Iwata, 1954
- Lineus capensis Wheeler, 1940
- Lineus caputornatus Takakura, 1898
- Lineus cinereus Punnett, 1903
- Lineus cingulatus (Stimpson, 1855)
- Lineus coccinus Bürger, 1892
- Lineus collaris (Schmarda, 1859)
- Lineus coloratus (Bürger, 1890)
- Lineus copus Corrêa, 1958
- Lineus crosslandi Punnett & Cooper, 1909
- Lineus desori Schmidt, 1946
- Lineus dohrnii (Hubrecht, 1879)
- Lineus fischeri Senz, 1997
- Lineus flammeus
- Lineus flavescens Coe, 1904
- Lineus frauenfeldi Senz, 1997
- Lineus fulvus Iwata, 1954
- Lineus fuscoviridis Takakura, 1898
- Lineus galbanus (Bürger, 1890)
- Lineus gesserensis (O. F. Müller, 1774)
- Lineus gilbus Bürger, 1892
- Lineus gilviceps Sundberg & Gibson, 1995
- Lineus glaucus (Bürger, 1890)
- Lineus grubei (Hubrecht, 1879)
- Lineus hancocki Punnett & Cooper, 1909
- Lineus hiatti Coe, 1947
- Lineus hubrechti (Langerhans, 1880)
- Lineus indicus Punnett & Cooper, 1909
- Lineus insignis Senz, 1993
- Lineus iota Joubin, 1902
- Lineus islandicus Friedrich, 1958
- Lineus kennelii Bürger, 1892
- Lineus kolaensis Ushakov, 1928
- Lineus kristinebergensis Gering, 1912
- Lineus lacticapitatus Wheeler, 1940
- Lineus lancearius Korotkevich, 1978
- Lineus levinensis Korotkevich, 1978
- Lineus linearis Montagu, 1808
- Lineus lobianki Bürger, 1892
- Lineus longifissus sensu Takakura, 1898
- Lineus longifissus sensu Iwata, 1952
- Lineus longissimus (Gunnerus, 1770)
- Lineus marisalbi Ushakov, 1926
- Lineus mascarensis Punnett & Cooper, 1909
- Lineus mcintoshii (Langerhans, 1880)
- Lineus molochinus Bürger, 1892
- Lineus monolineatus Staub, 1900
- Lineus nigrobrunneus Bergendal, 1903
- Lineus nigrofuscus (Stimpson, 1857)
- Lineus nigrostriatus Iwata, 1954
- Lineus nipponensis Senz, 2001
- Lineus obscurus
- Lineus oculatus
- Lineus orientalis Punnett & Cooper, 1901
- Lineus ornatus Wheeler, 1940
- Lineus pallidus Verrill, 1879
- Lineus parvulus Bürger, 1892
- Lineus patulus Isler, 1900
- Lineus pictifrons Coe, 1904
- Lineus picus Corrêa, 1958
- Lineus polyophthalmus (Schmarda, 1859)
- Lineus pseudoruber (Friedrich, 1935)
- Lineus psittacinus (Bürger, 1890)
- Lineus quadratus Korotkevich, 1978
- Lineus ramosus Isler, 1900
- Lineus rovinjensis Senz, 1995
- Lineus ruber (Müller, 1774)
- Lineus rubescens Coe, 1904
- Lineus rufocaudatus Bürger, 1892
- Lineus sainthilairi Ushakov, 1926
- Lineus sanguineus (Rathke, 1799)
- Lineus scandinaviensis Punnett, 1903
- Lineus schmidti Korotkevich, 1978
- Lineus schultzei Senz, 2001
- Lineus sowerbyi Senz, 2001
- Lineus spatiosus Iwata, 1954
- Lineus stigmatus Coe, 1951
- Lineus subcingulatus Takakura, 1898
- Lineus torquatus Coe, 1901
- Lineus trilobulatus Korotkevich, 1978
- Lineus truncatus (Hubrecht, 1887)
- Lineus turqueti Joubin, 1905
- Lineus variegatus Chapuis, 1886
- Lineus versicolor Bürger, 1892
- Lineus viridis (Müller, 1774)
- Lineus viridis Saint-Loup, 1886
- Lineus vittatus (Quoy & Gaimard, 1833)
- Lineus viviparus Isler, 1900
