= Pussylineus =

Scientific classification
- Kingdom: Animalia
- Phylum: Nemertea
- Class: Pilidiophora
- Order: Heteronemertea
- Family: Lineidae
- Genus: Pussylineus; Corrêa, 1956
- Species: P. gabriellae

Binomial name
- Pussylineus gabriellae Corrêa, 1956

Genus of ribbon worms

Pussylineus is a monotypic genus of nemerteans belonging to the family Lineidae. The only species is Pussylineus gabriellae.
