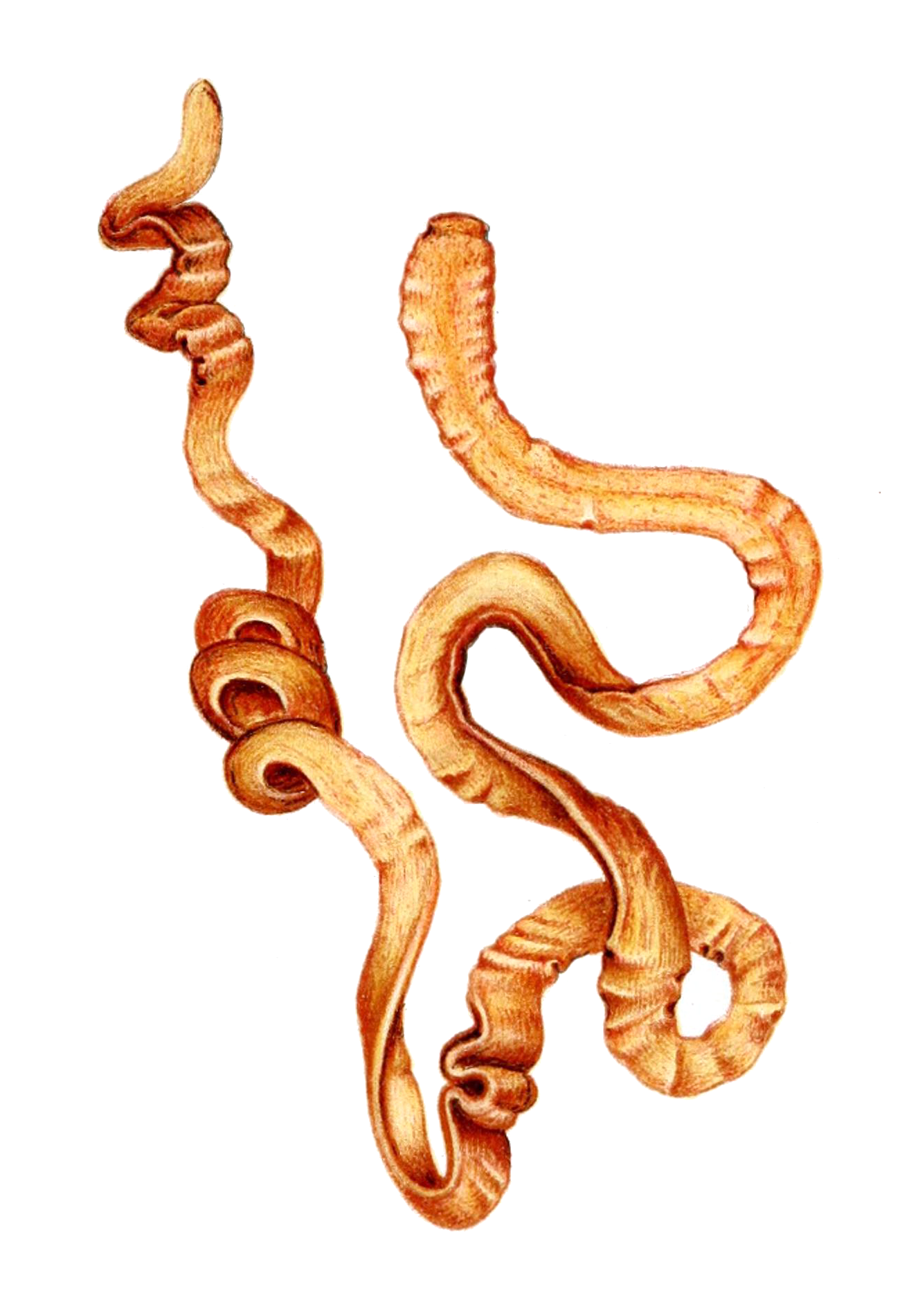
- Baseodiscus princeps

Scientific classification
- Domain: Eukaryota
- Kingdom: Animalia
- Phylum: Nemertea
- Class: Pilidiophora
- Order: Heteronemertea
- Family: Valenciniidae

= Valenciniidae =

Family of ribbon worms

Valenciniidae is a family of worms belonging to the order Heteronemertea.

== Genera ==
Genera:

- Baseodiscus Diesing, 1850
- Borlasia Oken, 1815
- Cephalomastax Iwata, 1957
- Chilineus Friedrich, 1970
- Joubinia Bürger, 1895
- Kukumia Gibson & Sundberg, 2002
- Polina Stimpson, 1857
- Poliopsis Joubin, 1890
- Sonnenemertes Chernyshev, Abukawa & Kajihara, 2015
- Taeniosoma Stimpson, 1857
- Uchidana Iwata, 1967
- Valenciennesia Joubin, 1894
- Valencinia Quatrefages, 1846
