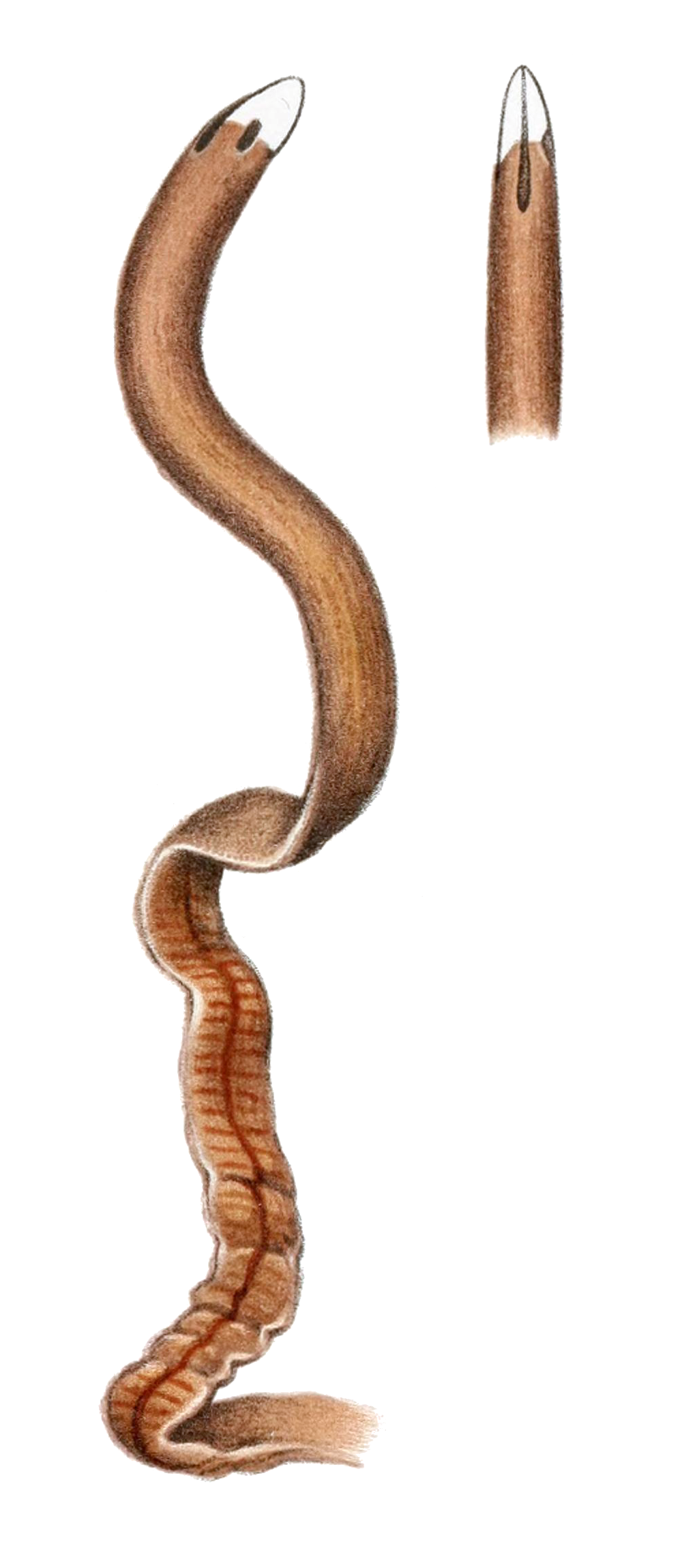
- Cerebratulus albifrons

Scientific classification
- Domain: Eukaryota
- Kingdom: Animalia
- Phylum: Nemertea
- Class: Pilidiophora
- Order: Heteronemertea
- Family: Lineidae
- Genus: Cerebratulus; Renier, 1804

= Cerebratulus =

Genus of ribbon worms

Cerebratulus is a genus of nemerteans belonging to the family Lineidae.

The genus has cosmopolitan distribution.

== Species ==
Species:

- Cerebratulus acutus Nardo, 1847
- Cerebratulus aerugatus Bürger, 1892
- Cerebratulus albifrons Coe, 1901
- Cerebratulus albulus (Stimpson, 1857)
- Cerebratulus alleni Wijnhoff, 1912
- Cerebratulus anguillula Bürger, 1892
- Cerebratulus angulatus (Müller, 1774)
- Cerebratulus angusticeps Hubrecht, 1887
- Cerebratulus annellatus (Leuckart, 1849)
- Cerebratulus antillensis Coe, 1901
- Cerebratulus aracaensis Senz, 1997
- Cerebratulus arnosus Takakura, 1898
- Cerebratulus aureolus Bürger, 1892
- Cerebratulus australis (Stimpson, 1857)
- Cerebratulus barentsi Bürger, 1895
- Cerebratulus bedfordii Punnett, 1900
- Cerebratulus bicornis Joubin & François, 1892
- Cerebratulus bilineatus sensu Delle Chiaje, 1829
- Cerebratulus bivittatus Uljanin, 1870
- Cerebratulus borealis (Diesing, 1862)
- Cerebratulus brevis Ushakov, 1926
- Cerebratulus brunneus Punnett, 1900
- Cerebratulus caledonicus Joubin & François, 1892
- Cerebratulus californiensis Coe, 1905
- Cerebratulus cestoides Bürger, 1895
- Cerebratulus chilensis Friedrich, 1970
- Cerebratulus complanatus (Kölliker, 1845)
- Cerebratulus croceus Grube, 1864
- Cerebratulus darvelli Gibson, 1990
- Cerebratulus depressus Quatrefages, 1846
- Cerebratulus eisigii Hubrecht, 1880
- Cerebratulus epsilon Joubin, 1902
- Cerebratulus erythrorochma Joubin, 1902
- Cerebratulus erythrus Punnett, 1900
- Cerebratulus ferrugineus Bürger, 1892
- Cerebratulus fissuralis Friedrich, 1958
- Cerebratulus flavifrons Grube, 1864
- Cerebratulus formosus Iwata, 1957
- Cerebratulus fuscoides Bürger, 1892
- Cerebratulus fuscus (McIntosh, 1874)
- Cerebratulus gamma Joubin, 1902
- Cerebratulus gardineri Punnett, 1903
- Cerebratulus gracilis Staub, 1900
- Cerebratulus greenlandicus Punnett, 1901
- Cerebratulus haddoni Punnett, 1900
- Cerebratulus hepaticus Hubrecht, 1879
- Cerebratulus herculeus Coe, 1901
- Cerebratulus insignis Punnett, 1900
- Cerebratulus ischurus Punnett, 1903
- Cerebratulus johnstoni Wheeler, 1940
- Cerebratulus joubini Bürger, 1895
- Cerebratulus kowalewskii
- Cerebratulus krempfi Joubin, 1904
- Cerebratulus lactea
- Cerebratulus lacteus (Leidy, 1851)
- Cerebratulus larseni Wheeler, 1934
- Cerebratulus latistomachus Staub, 1900
- Cerebratulus laureolus Staub, 1900
- Cerebratulus leucopsis (Coe, 1901)
- Cerebratulus liguricus Blanchard, 1849
- Cerebratulus lineolatus Coe, 1905
- Cerebratulus lividus Bürger, 1892
- Cerebratulus longiceps Coe, 1901
- Cerebratulus longifissus sensu Punnett, 1903
- Cerebratulus longifissus Ushakov, 1928
- Cerebratulus luteus Bürger, 1890
- Cerebratulus macroren Hubrecht, 1887
- Cerebratulus macrorrhochmus (Schmarda, 1859)

» Subspecies Cerebratulus macrorrhochmus macrorrhochmus accepted as Cerebratulus macrorrhochmus (Schmarda, 1859) (synonym)

- Cerebratulus macrostomus (Schmarda, 1859)
- Cerebratulus maculatus Punnett, 1903
- Cerebratulus magneticus Gibson, 1981
- Cerebratulus maldivensis Punnett, 1903
- Cerebratulus malvini Wheeler, 1934
- Cerebratulus marginatus Renier, 1804
- Cerebratulus medullatus Hubrecht, 1887
- Cerebratulus melanops Coe & Kunkel, 1903
- Cerebratulus melanorhynchus Bürger, 1895
- Cerebratulus modestus Chapuis, 1886
- Cerebratulus multiporatus Punnett & Cooper, 1909
- Cerebratulus niveus (Punnett, 1903)
- Cerebratulus norvegicus Punnett, 1903
- Cerebratulus notabilis Bürger, 1892
- Cerebratulus occidentalis Coe, 1901
- Cerebratulus oleaginus Stimpson, 1857
- Cerebratulus orochi Kajihara, 2020
- Cerebratulus pachyrhynchus (Schmarda, 1859)
- Cerebratulus paludicolus Stimpson, 1857
- Cerebratulus pantherinus Hubrecht, 1879
- Cerebratulus parkeri Hubrecht, 1887
- Cerebratulus profundifissus Staub, 1900
- Cerebratulus pullus Bürger, 1890
- Cerebratulus queenslandicus Punnett, 1900
- Cerebratulus rigidus Isler, 1900
- Cerebratulus robustus Punnett, 1900
- Cerebratulus roseus (Delle Chiaje, 1841)
- Cerebratulus rubellus (Stimpson, 1855)
- Cerebratulus rubens Bürger, 1890
- Cerebratulus ruber (Girard, 1853)
- Cerebratulus signatus Coe, 1905
- Cerebratulus simulans Bürger, 1892
- Cerebratulus sinensis (Stimpson, 1855)
- Cerebratulus sordidus Punnett, 1900
- Cerebratulus spadix Bürger, 1890
- Cerebratulus striolentus (Girard, 1853)
- Cerebratulus subacutus (Stimpson, 1857)
- Cerebratulus superniger Iwata, 1957
- Cerebratulus tageae Corrêa, 1957
- Cerebratulus theta Joubin, 1902
- Cerebratulus tigrinus Bürger, 1890
- Cerebratulus torresianus Punnett, 1900
- Cerebratulus ulatiformius Punnett, 1900
- Cerebratulus urticans (Müller, 1854)
- Cerebratulus validus Bürger, 1893
- Cerebratulus velatus Joubin, 1905
- Cerebratulus ventriporis Friedrich, 1958
- Cerebratulus ventrosulcatus Bürger, 1892
- Cerebratulus ventrosulcatus Renier, 1804
- Cerebratulus viridis sensu Saint-Loup, 1887
- Cerebratulus zachsi Ushakov, 1926
- Cerebratulus zebra Punnett & Cooper, 1909
- Cerebratulus zeta Joubin, 1902
