= Mixolineidae =

Scientific classification
- Domain: Eukaryota
- Kingdom: Animalia
- Phylum: Nemertea
- Class: Pilidiophora
- Order: Heteronemertea
- Family: Mixolineidae

Family of ribbon worms

Mixolineidae is a family of worms belonging to the order Heteronemertea.

Genera:

- Aetheorhynchus Gibson, 1981
- Mixolineus Müller & Scripcariu, 1971
