= Zygeupolia =

Scientific classification
- Domain: Eukaryota
- Kingdom: Animalia
- Phylum: Nemertea
- Class: Pilidiophora
- Order: Heteronemertea
- Family: Lineidae
- Genus: Zygeupolia; Thompson, 1900

Synonyms
- Micrella Punnett, 1901

Genus of ribbon worms

Zygeupolia is a genus of nemerteans belonging to the family Lineidae.

The species of this genus are found in Northern America.

Species:

- Zygeupolia rubens (Coe, 1895)
- Zygeupolia rufa (Punnett, 1901)
