= Polybrachiorhynchidae =

Scientific classification
- Domain: Eukaryota
- Kingdom: Animalia
- Phylum: Nemertea
- Class: Pilidiophora
- Order: Heteronemertea
- Family: Polybrachiorhynchidae

Family of ribbon worms

Polybrachiorhynchidae is a family of worms belonging to the order Heteronemertea.

Genera:

- Polybrachiorhynchus Gibson, 1977
- Polydendrorhynchus Yin & Zeng, 1986
