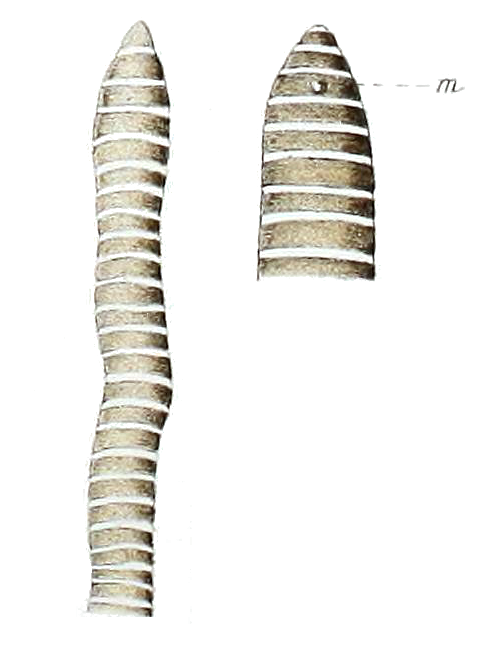
- Baseodiscus mexicanus (from Bürger, 1893)

Scientific classification
- Kingdom: Animalia
- Phylum: Nemertea
- Class: Pilidiophora
- Order: Heteronemertea
- Family: Valenciniidae
- Genus: Baseodiscus; Diesing, 1850

= Baseodiscus =

Genus of ribbon worms

Baseodiscus is a genus of nemerteans belonging to the family Valenciniidae.

The genus has cosmopolitan distribution.

In 2025, a Baseodiscus punnetti was reported that has lived for at least 26 years.

== Species ==
Species:

- Baseodiscus abyssorum (Joubin, 1902)
- Baseodiscus alpha (Joubin, 1902)
- Baseodiscus anocellatus Korotkevich, 1978
- Baseodiscus antarcticus Baylis, 1915
- Baseodiscus antillensis (Bürger, 1895)
- Baseodiscus aureus (Bürger, 1896)
- Baseodiscus australis (Hubrecht, 1887)
- Baseodiscus bilineatus (Schmarda, 1859)
- Baseodiscus cingulatus (Coe, 1906)
- Baseodiscus delineatus (Delle Chiaje, 1825)
- Baseodiscus discolor (Coe, 1901)
- Baseodiscus edmondsoni Coe, 1934
- Baseodiscus filholi (Joubin, 1902)
- Baseodiscus giardii (Hubrecht, 1887)
- Baseodiscus hemprichii (Ehrenberg, 1831)
- Baseodiscus indicus (Punnett, 1903)
- Baseodiscus jonasii Strand, Hjelmgren & Sundberg, 2005
- Baseodiscus longissimus Punnett & Cooper, 1909
- Baseodiscus lumbricoides (von Graff, 1899)
- Baseodiscus maculosus (Bürger, 1895)
- Baseodiscus mexicanus (Bürger, 1893)
- Baseodiscus minor (Hubrecht, 1879)
- Baseodiscus multiporatus (Punnett, 1900)
- Baseodiscus nipponensis (Hubrecht, 1887)
- Baseodiscus pallidus (Isler, 1900)
- Baseodiscus pellucidus (Kennel, 1891)
- Baseodiscus pholidotus (Punnett, 1900)
- Baseodiscus platei (Bürger, 1896)
- Baseodiscus princeps (Coe, 1901)
- Baseodiscus punnetti (Coe, 1904)
- Baseodiscus quinquelineatus (Quoy & Gaimard, 1833)
- Baseodiscus rugosus (Punnett, 1900)
- Baseodiscus sordidus Punnett & Cooper, 1909
- Baseodiscus sulcatus (Isler, 1900)
- Baseodiscus takakurai Gibson, 1995
- Baseodiscus unicolor Stiasny-Wijnhoff, 1925
- Baseodiscus unistriatus (Isler, 1900)
- Baseodiscus univittatus (Coe, 1906)
