= Sulcus spiralis internus =

Concavity

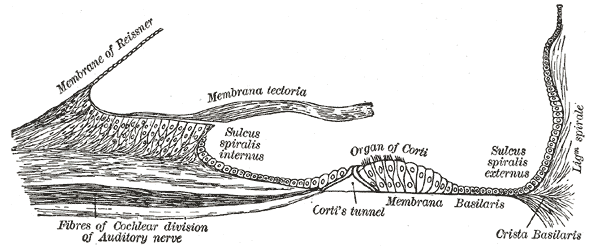
- Floor of ductus cochlearis.

Details

Identifiers
- Latin: Sulcus spiralis internus
- TA98: A15.3.03.123
- FMA: 77850 77850, 77850

On the upper plate of that part of the lamina which is outside the vestibular membrane, the periosteum is thickened to form the spiral limbus, this ends externally in a concavity, the sulcus spiralis internus, which represents, on section, the form of the letter C.
