= Poliopsis =

Scientific classification
- Kingdom: Animalia
- Phylum: Nemertea
- Class: Pilidiophora
- Order: Heteronemertea
- Family: Poliopsiidae
- Genus: Poliopsis; Joubin, 1890
- Species: P. lacazei

Binomial name
- Poliopsis lacazei Joubin, 1890

Genus of ribbon worms

Poliopsis is a monotypic genus of nemerteans belonging to the monotypic family Poliopsiidae. The only species is Poliopsis lacazei.

The species is found in France.
