= Spiral limbus =

Spiral tuberculosis specimen

Limbus spiralis
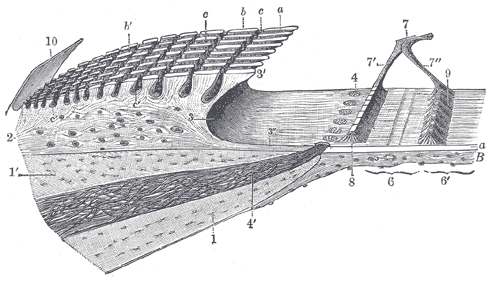
- Limbus laminæ spiralis and membrana basilaris. (Schematic.) 1, 1’. Upper and lower lamellæ of the lamina spiralis ossea. 2. Limbus laminæ spiralis, with a, the teeth of the first row; b, b’, the auditory teeth of the other rows; c, c’, the interdental grooves and the cells which are lodged in them. 3. Sulcus spiralis internus, with 3’, its labium vestibulare, and 3”, its labium tympanicum. 4. Foramina nervosa, giving passage to the nerves from the ganglion spirale or ganglion of Corti. 5. Vas spirale. 6. Zona arcuata, and 6’, zona pectinata of the basilar membrane, with a, its hyaline layer, B, its connective-tissue layer. 7. Arch of spiral organ, with 7’, its inner rod, and 7”, its outer rod. 8 feet (2.4 m) of the internal rods, from which the cells are removed. 9 feet (2.7 m) of the external rods. 10. Vestibular membrane, at its origin.

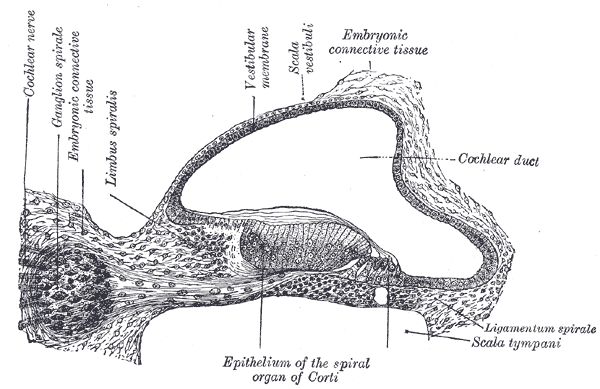
- Transverse section of the cochlear duct of a fetal cat. (Limbus spiralis is labeled at top, fourth from left.)

Details

Identifiers
- Latin: limbus laminae spiralis ossi
- TA98: A15.3.03.104
- TA2: 7033
- FMA: 77843

The spiral limbus is a bony part of the ear.

The osseous spiral lamina consists of two plates of bone, and between these are the canals for the transmission of the filaments of the acoustic nerve. On the upper plate of that part of the lamina which is outside the vestibular membrane, the periosteum is thickened to form the limbus spiralis (or limbus laminæ spiralis). It ends externally in a concavity, the sulcus spiralis internus, which represents, on section, the form of the letter C.
