= Sulcus spiralis externus =

Anatomical feature

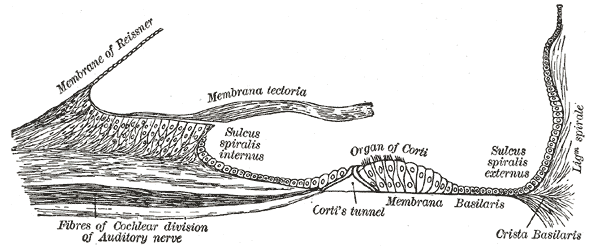
- Floor of ductus cochlearis.

Details

Identifiers
- Latin: Sulcus spiralis externus
- TA98: A15.3.03.124
- FMA: 77851

The basilar crest gives attachment to the outer edge of the basilar membrane; immediately above the crest is a concavity, the sulcus spiralis externus.
