= Panorhynchus =

Scientific classification
- Kingdom: Animalia
- Phylum: Nemertea
- Class: Pilidiophora
- Order: Heteronemertea
- Family: Panorhynchidae
- Genus: Panorhynchus; Serna de Esteban & Moretto, 1969
- Species: P. argentinensis

Binomial name
- Panorhynchus argentinensis Serna de Esteban & Moretto, 1969

Genus of ribbon worms

Panorhynchus is a monotypic genus of worms belonging to the monotypic family Panorhynchidae. The only species is Panorhynchus argentinensis.
