= Gorgonorhynchus =

Scientific classification
- Domain: Eukaryota
- Kingdom: Animalia
- Phylum: Nemertea
- Class: Pilidiophora
- Order: Heteronemertea
- Family: Gorgonorhynchidae
- Genus: Gorgonorhynchus; Dakin & Fordham, 1931

Family/genus of worms

Gorgonorhynchidae is a family of worms belonging to the order Heteronemertea. The family consists of only one genus: Gorgonorhynchus Dakin & Fordham, 1931.
