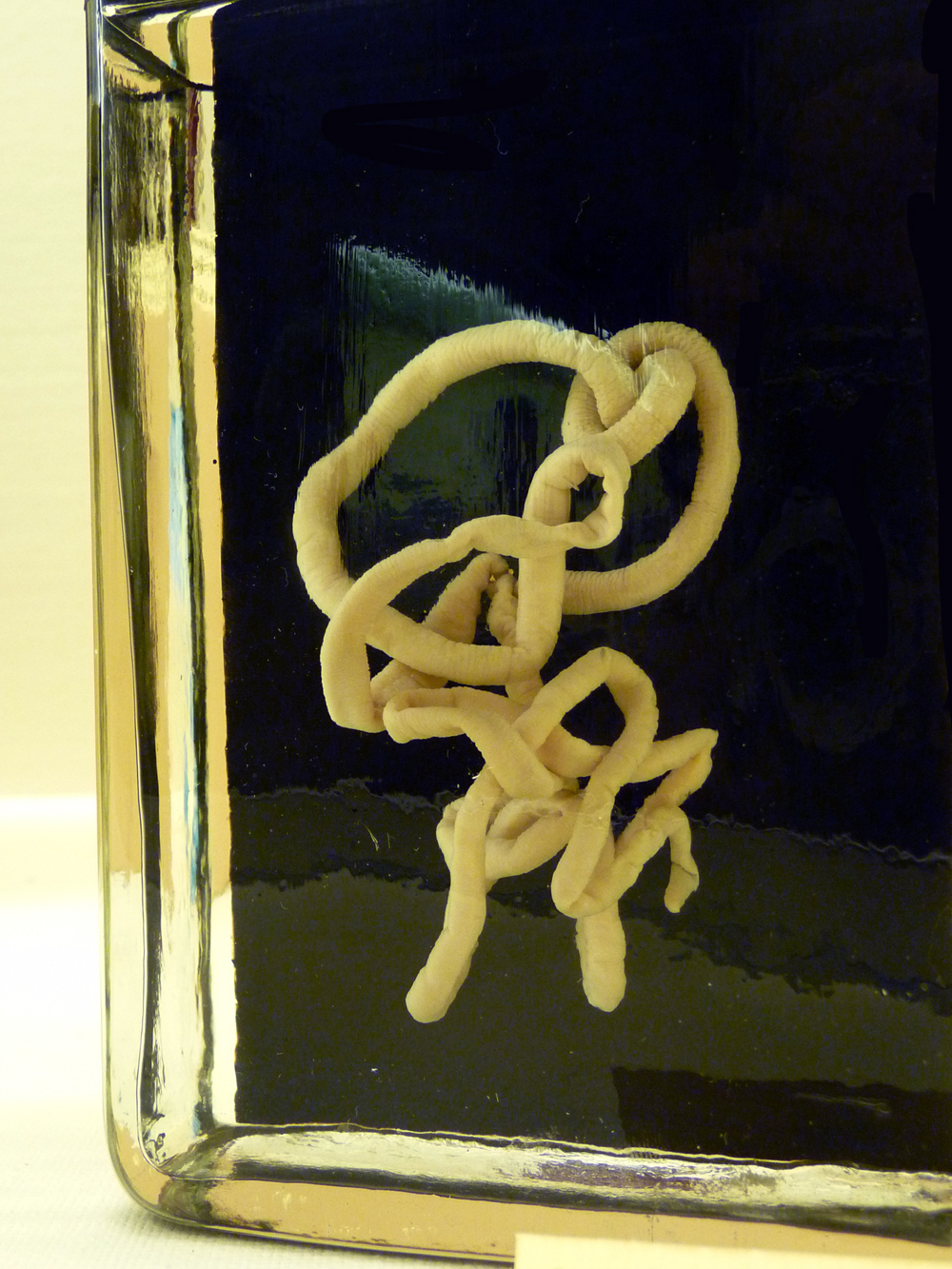
- Lineus longissimus

Scientific classification
- Kingdom: Animalia
- Phylum: Nemertea
- Class: Pilidiophora
- Order: Heteronemertea
- Family: Lineidae; McIntosh, 1873–1874

Synonyms
- Cerebratulidae; Riseriellidae

= Lineidae =

Family of ribbon worms

Lineidae is a family of nemertean worms. It contains the following genera:

- Adenorhagas Riser, 1990
- Aetheolineus Senz, 1993
- Aetheorhynchus Gibson, 1981
- Ammolineus Senz, 2001
- Amniclineus Gibson & Qi, 1991
- Amorphonemertes Cantell, 1998
- Antarctolineus Muller & Scripcariu, 1964
- Apatronemertes Wilfert & Gibson, 1974
- Archimicrura Chernyshev, 2025
- Australineus Gibson, 1990
- Bennettiella Gibson, 1982
- Bilucernus Ikenaga, Maslakova, Yoshida & Kajihara, 2025
- Cephalurichus Gibson, 1985
- Cerebratulides Stiasny-Wijnhoff, 1942
- Cerebratulina Gibson, 1990
- Cerebratulus Renier, 1804
- Chilineus Friedrich, 1970
- Colemaniella Gibson, 1982
- Corsoua Corrêa, 1963
- Craticulineus Gibson, 1984
- Diplopleura Stimpson, 1857
- Dokonemertes Gibson, 1985
- Dushia Corrêa, 1963
- Eousia Gibson, 1990
- Epithetosoma Danielssen & Koren, 1880
- Euborlasia Vaillant, 1890
- Evelineus Corrêa, 1954
- Flaminga Corrêa, 1957
- Fragilonemertes Riser, 1998
- Gastropion Moretto, 1998
- Gorgonorhynchus Dakin & Fordham, 1931
- Heteroenopleus Wern, 1998
- Heterolineus Friedrich, 1935
- Heteronemertes Chernyshev, 1995
- Hinumanemertes Iwata, 1970
- Huilkalineus Senz, 1993
- Huilkia de la Serna de Esteban & Moretto, 1968
- Iwatanemertes Gibson, 1990
- Junoya Chernyshev, 2025
- Kirsteueria Gibson, 1978
- Kohnia Sundberg & Gibson, 1995
- Kukumia Gibson & Sundberg, 2002
- Kulikovia Chernyshev, Polyakova, Turanov & Kajihara, 2018
- Leucocephalonemertes Cantell, 1996
- Lineopsella Friedrich, 1970
- Lineopselloides Gibson, 1990
- Lineopsis Staub, 1900
- Lineus Sowerby, 1806
- Maculaura Hiebert & Maslakova, 2015
- Micconemertes Gibson, 1997
- Micrellides Gibson, 1985
- Micrura Ehrenberg, 1871
- Micrurides Friedrich, 1960
- Micrurimorpha Korotkevich, 1980
- Micrurina Stiasny-Wijnhoff, 1942
- Micrurinella Friedrich, 1960
- Mixolineus Müller & Scripcariu, 1971
- Myorhynchonemertes Senz, 1997
- Nemertoscolex Greeff, 1879
- Nipponomicrura Chernyshev, 1995
- Notospermus Huschke, 1829
- Panorhynchus de la Serna de Esteban & Moretto, 1969
- Paracerebratulus Senz, 1997
- Paralineopsis Iwata, 1993
- Paralineus Schütz, 1911
- Paramicrura Gibson & Sundberg, 1992
- Paramicrurinella Gibson, 1985
- Pararosa Junoy & Verdes, 2025
- Parborlasia Friedrich in Serna de Esteban & Moretto, 1968
- Parvicirrus Ris, 1993
- Peavinenemertes Iwata, 2011
- Perissonemertes Gibson, 1990
- Polybrachiorhynchus Gibson, 1977
- Polydendrorhynchus Yin & Zeng, 1986
- Pontolineus Müller & Scripcariu, 1964
- Praealbonemertes Cantell, 1993
- Pseudomicrura Strand & Sundberg, 2011
- Pussylineus Corrêa, 1956
- Quasilineus Gibson, 1981
- Quasimicrura Chernyshev, 2025
- Quasiutolineides Senz, 2001
- Riseriellus Rogers, Junoy, Gibson & Thorpe, 1993
- Riserius Norenburg, 1993
- Siphonenteron Renier in Meneghini, 1847
- Tarrhomyos Ris, 1993
- Tenuilineus Ris, 1993
- Uchidana Iwata, 1967
- Uricholemma Sundberg & Gibson, 1995
- Utolineides Senz, 1997
- Utolineus Gibson, 1990
- Wiotkenia de la Serna de Esteban & Moretto, 1969
- Yininemertes Sun and Lu, 2008
- Zodionemertes Gibson, 1985
- Zygeupolia Thompson, 1900
