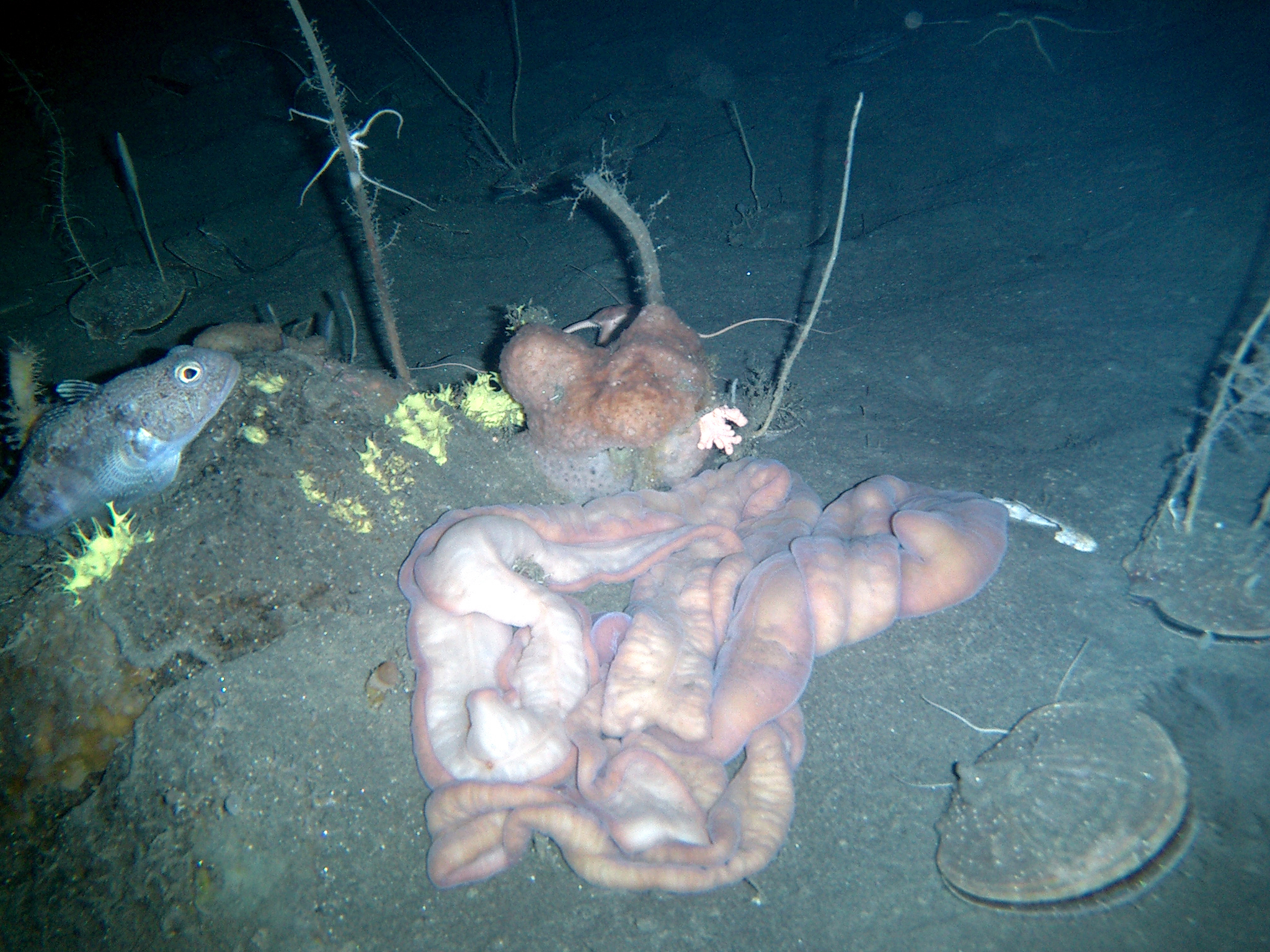
- An example of Heteronemertea, the Parborlasia corrugatus

Scientific classification
- Kingdom: Animalia
- Phylum: Nemertea
- Class: Pilidiophora
- Order: Heteronemertea; Bürger, 1892

Families
- See text.

= Heteronemertea =

Order of ribbon worms

Heteronemertea is a monophyletic order of about 500 species of nemertean worms. It contains genera such as Lineus and Cerebratulus, and includes the largest and most muscular nemerteans.

Almost all heteronemerteans have three primary body-wall muscle strata: an outer longitudinal, a middle circular, and an inner longitudinal. The lateral nerve cords are outside the circular muscle, as in palaeonemerteans, but separated from the epidermis by the usually well-developed outer longitudinal muscle.

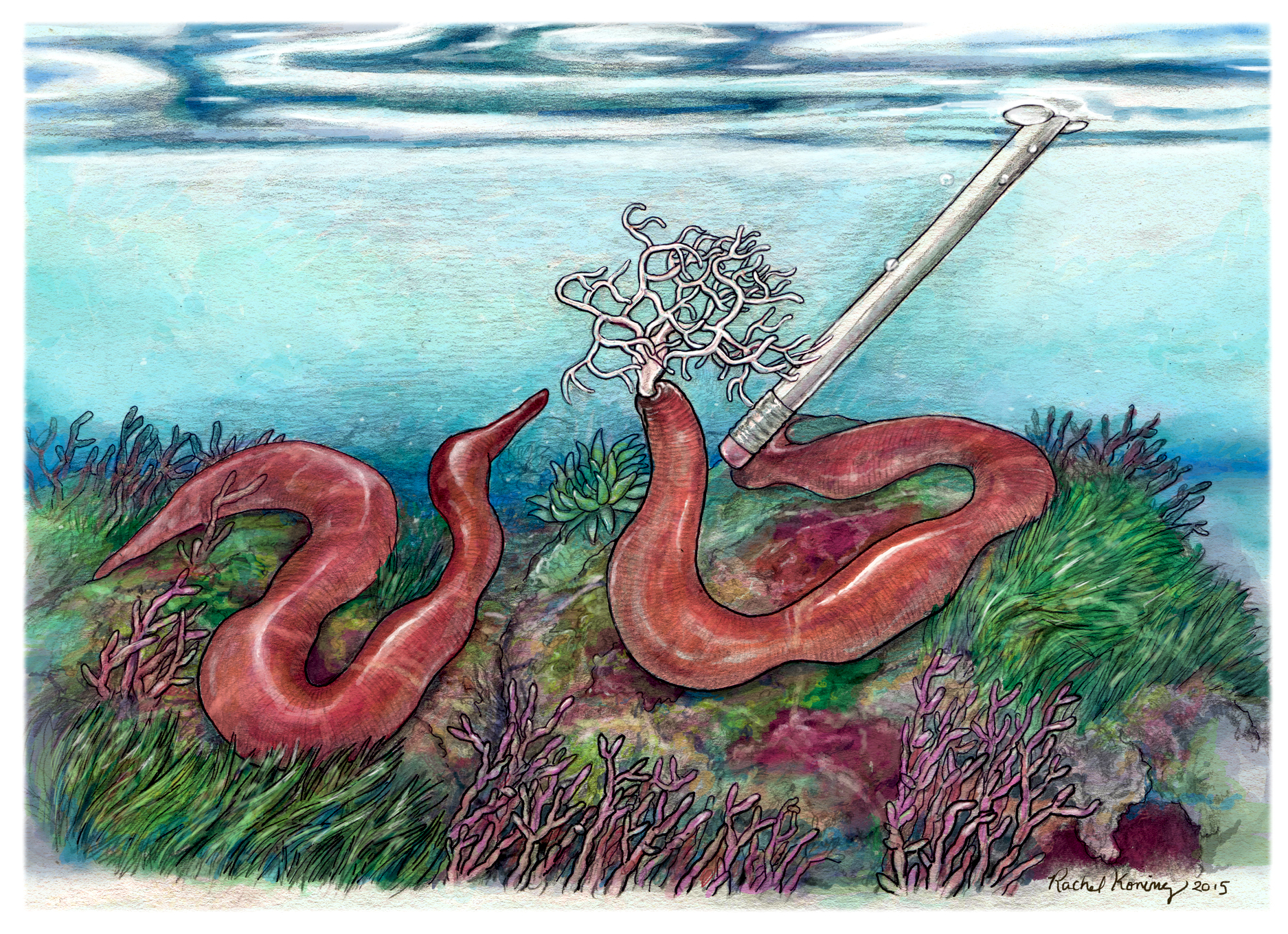
Illustration of Gorgonorhynchus repens, a species within the family Gorgonorhynchidae, discharging its proboscis in response to a perceived threat.

== Taxonomy ==
Families within the order Heteronemertea include:

- Baseodiscidae
- Cerebratulidae
- Gorgonorhynchidae
- Lineidae
- Mixolineidae
- Panorhynchidae
- Poliopsiidae
- Polybrachiorhynchidae
- Pussylineidae
- Riseriellidae
- Valenciniidae
