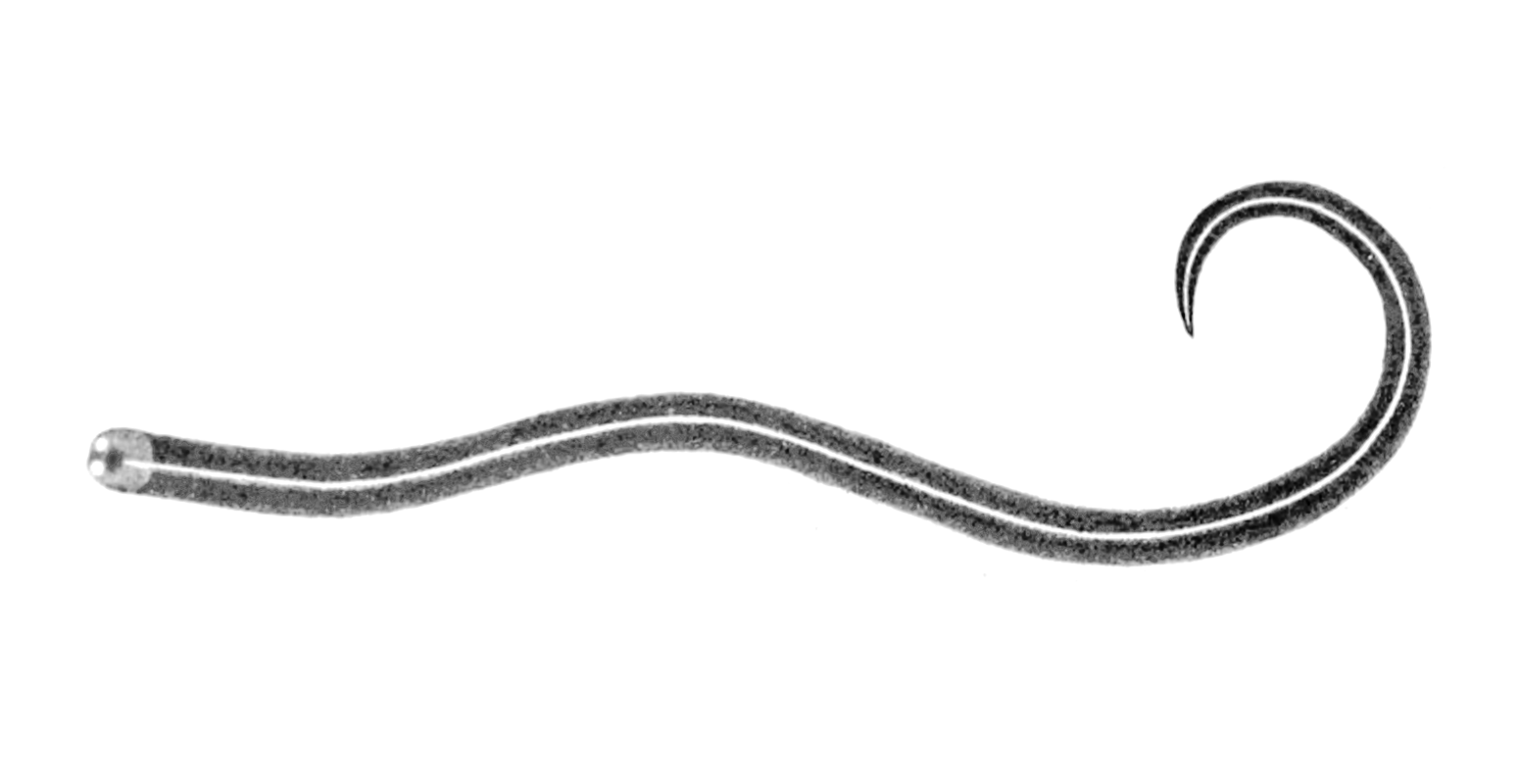

Conservation status
- Extinct (IUCN 3.1)

Scientific classification
- Domain: Eukaryota
- Kingdom: Animalia
- Phylum: Nemertea
- Class: Hoplonemertea
- Order: Monostilifera
- Family: Prosorhochmidae
- Genus: Geonemertes
- Species: †G. rodericana

Binomial name
- †Geonemertes rodericana Gulliver, 1879

Synonyms
- Tetrastemma rodericanum Gulliver, 1879

= Geonemertes rodericana =

Species of worm

Geonemertes rodericana, the Rodrigues terrestrial ribbon worm, is an extinct species of terrestrial nemertean. It was endemic to the island of Rodrigues, east of Madagascar in the Indian Ocean.

== Details ==
G. rodericana was one to three inches long. Its body was dark green above with a narrow white streak down the middle, and a streak on each side. Its underbelly was white. Its head was a lighter green than the body, with four white spots on the front of the snout. Unlike its hermaphroditic relative Geonemertes pelaensis, G. rodericana was dioecious, with separate male and female sexes. This species lived in damp woods on rotten wood and under decaying leaves.

G. rodericana was discovered in 1874, and last seen in 1918. During the 19th and 20th centuries, all forest habitat on Rodrigues was cleared for agriculture and development (though small areas have been replanted since then); this deforestation most likely caused the extinction of G. rodericana, and searches in 1993 failed to find the species.
