= Argonemertes stocki =

Conservation status
- Data Deficient (IUCN 3.1)

Scientific classification
- Domain: Eukaryota
- Kingdom: Animalia
- Phylum: Nemertea
- Class: Hoplonemertea
- Order: Monostilifera
- Family: Acteonemertidae
- Genus: Argonemertes
- Species: A. stocki

Binomial name
- Argonemertes stocki (Moore, 1975)

Species of ribbon worm

Argonemertes stocki is a species of nemertean worms in the family Prosorhochmidae that is endemic to Australia, and is only known from one specimen found in 1972 in the New England National Park, New South Wales. It was found under a log in dry sclerophyll forest. It is threatened by invasive plant species and bush fires.
