= Argonemertes hillii =

Conservation status
- Least Concern (IUCN 3.1)

Scientific classification
- Kingdom: Animalia
- Phylum: Nemertea
- Class: Hoplonemertea
- Order: Monostilifera
- Family: Acteonemertidae
- Genus: Argonemertes
- Species: A. hillii

Binomial name
- Argonemertes hillii (Hett, 1924)

Species of ribbon worm

Argonemertes hillii is a species of nemertean worms in the family Prosorhochmidae that is endemic to Australia, and is found east of the Great Dividing Range in northern New South Wales and southern Queensland. It inhabits in damp woodlands, dry sclerophyll forests and tropical and subtropical rainforests, and is usually found under logs.
