= Antiponemertes allisonae =

Conservation status
- Endangered (IUCN 3.1)

Scientific classification
- Domain: Eukaryota
- Kingdom: Animalia
- Phylum: Nemertea
- Class: Hoplonemertea
- Order: Monostilifera
- Family: Prosorhochmidae
- Genus: Antiponemertes
- Species: A. allisonae

Binomial name
- Antiponemertes allisonae (Moore, 1973)

Synonyms
- Geonemertes allisonae Moore, 1973

Species of ribbon worm

Antiponemertes allisonae is a species of nemertean worm that is endemic to Banks Peninsula on New Zealand's South Island. It can be found in open bush under logs. It has not been recorded since 1961, and it has been suggested that this species may be extinct. If it is still extant, its habitat has been heavily altered by deforestation and grazing by introduced deer. This species may become transferred to the family Plectonemertidae as more taxonomic information becomes available.
