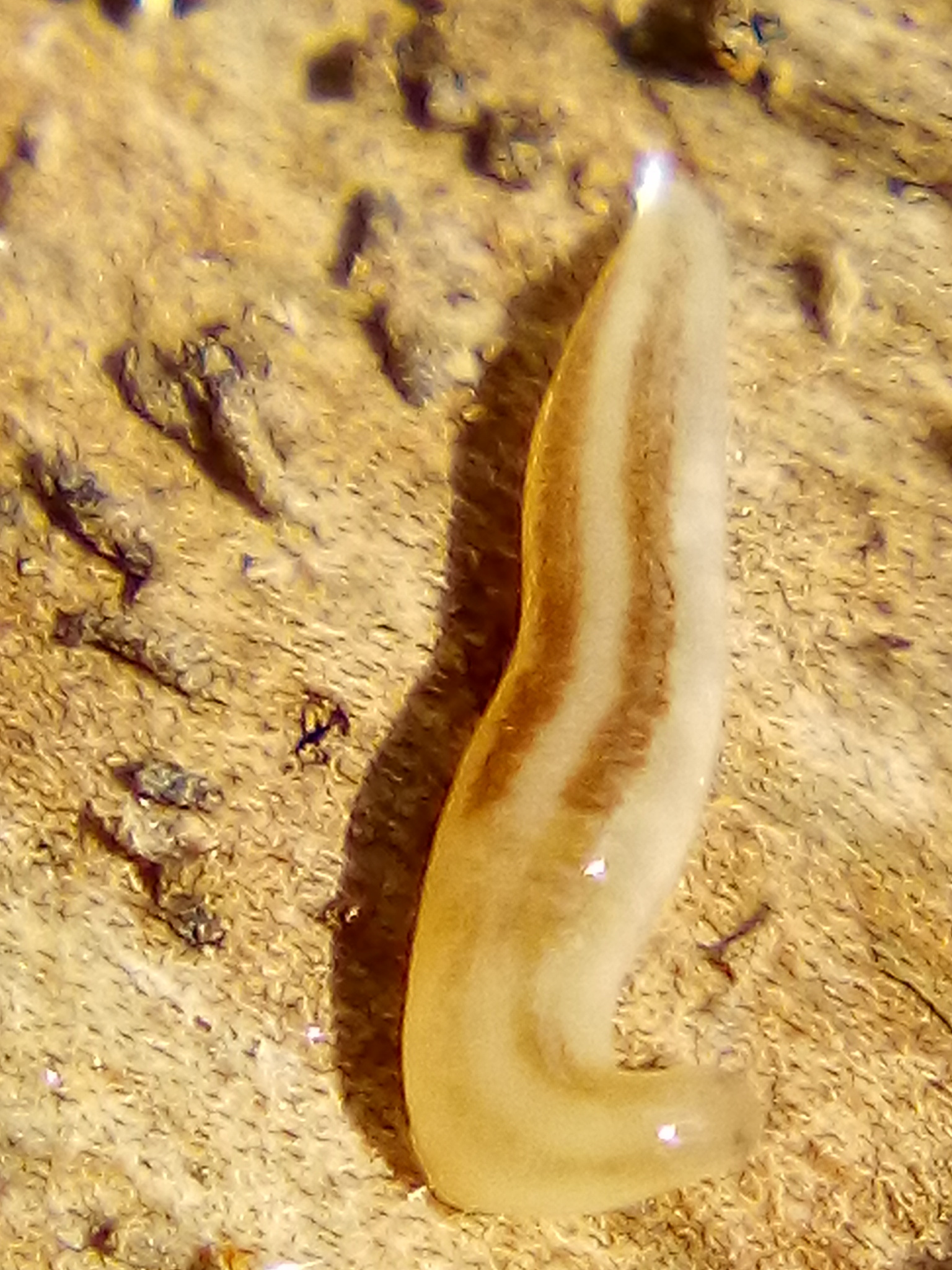
- An individual around Auckland.

Scientific classification
- Kingdom: Animalia
- Phylum: Nemertea
- Class: Hoplonemertea
- Order: Monostilifera
- Family: Acteonemertidae
- Genus: Argonemertes
- Species: A. dendyi

Binomial name
- Argonemertes dendyi (Dakin 1915)

Synonyms
- Geonemertes dendyi Dakin, 1915

= Argonemertes dendyi =

Species of terrestrial ribbon worm

Argonemertes dendyi is a species of enoplan; one of just twelve known species of land-dwelling ribbon worms.

== Taxonomy ==
Argonemertes dendyi was originally classified in the genus Geonemertes by William John Dakin. Dakin discovered and described the new species when he was searching for velvet worms in Western Australia's Darling Scarp.

A. dendyi belongs to the suborder Monostilifera, a clade defined having just one stylet – a small hard spine in their proboscis.

== Distribution ==
Argonemertes dendyi is believed to originate from Australia (where it was first described), but has been found in the British Isles, the Azores, the Canary Islands, California, Hawaii, Europe, and the North Island of New Zealand.
