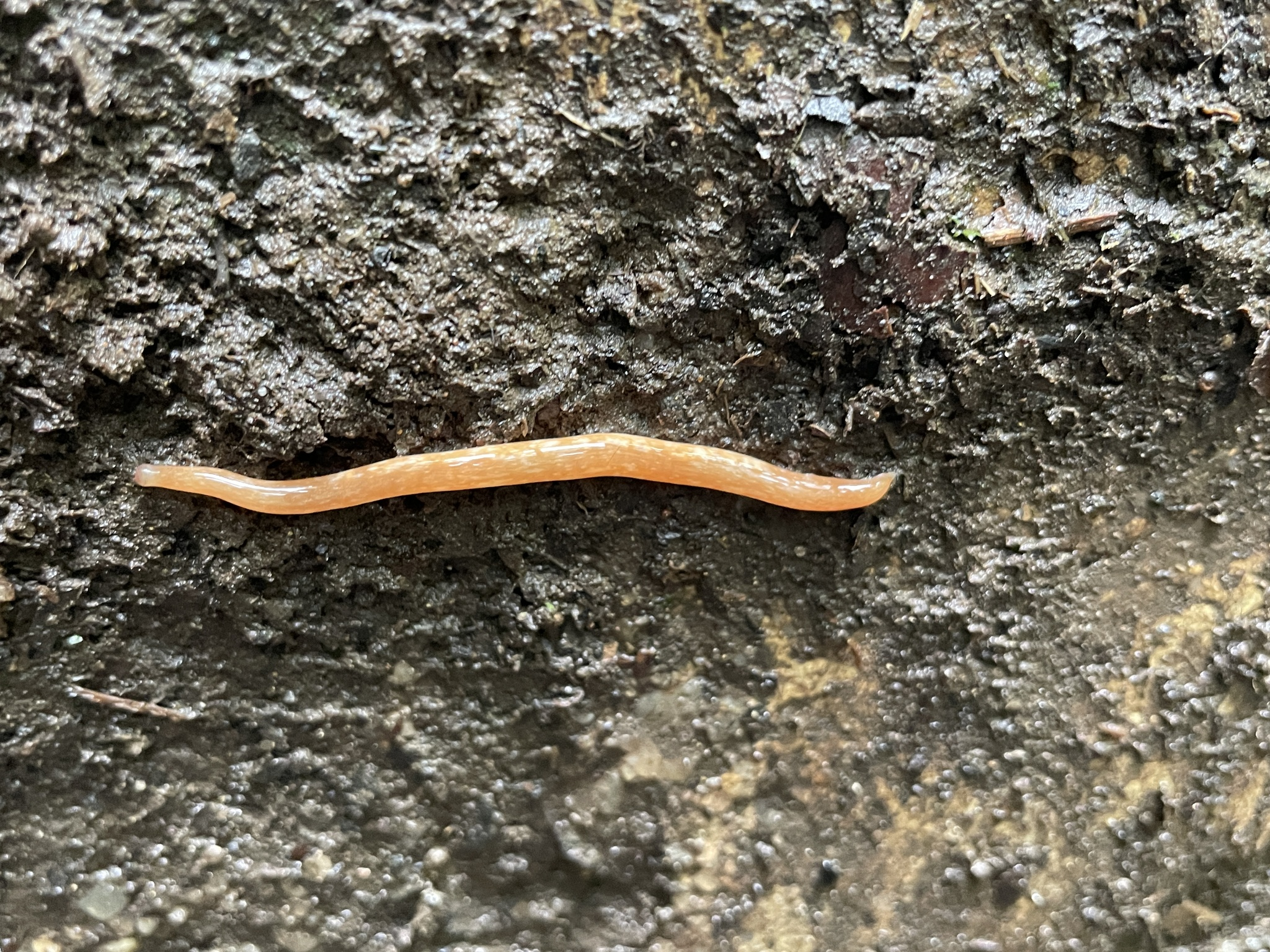

Scientific classification
- Kingdom: Animalia
- Phylum: Nemertea
- Class: Hoplonemertea
- Order: Monostilifera
- Family: Acteonemertidae
- Genus: Argonemertes
- Species: A. australiensis

Binomial name
- Argonemertes australiensis (Dendy, 1892)

Synonyms
- Geonemertes australiensis Dendy, 1892

= Argonemertes australiensis =

Species of worm

Argonemertes australiensis is a species of nemertean living in Australia.

== Description ==
It is yellow but color can be orange or brown, sometimes even creamy white.

The species is dioecious.

Males are 10–60 mm (0.39–2.36 in) long and 2.5 mm wide. Females are 12–84 mm (0.47–3.31 in) long and slightly wider when it is gravid.

== Distribution ==
A. australiensis can be found in Victoria, New South Wales, and Tasmania.
