= Dinonemertes arctica =

Scientific classification
- Domain: Eukaryota
- Kingdom: Animalia
- Phylum: Nemertea
- Class: Hoplonemertea
- Order: Polystilifera
- Family: Dinonemertidae
- Genus: Dinonemertes
- Species: D. arctica

Binomial name
- Dinonemertes arctica Korotkevich, 1977

Species of ribbon worm

Dinonemertes arctica is a species of ribbon worm within the family Dinonemertidae. The species was described from a male holotype collected from the Arctic Ocean in its central region at a depth of 2980 meters. A male paratype was also collected in the Greenland Sea at a depth of 2800 meters. D. arctica is distinguishable from other members of the family Dinonemertidae from the common opening of the mouth and rhynchodeum. Its internal morphology is typical of the Dinonemertes genus, consisting of a rhynchocoel wall with three muscle layers.
