= Sacconemertes =

Scientific classification
- Domain: Eukaryota
- Kingdom: Animalia
- Phylum: Nemertea
- Class: Hoplonemertea
- Order: Monostilifera
- Family: Sacconemertidae
- Genus: Sacconemertes; Karling, 1933

Genus of worms

Sacconemertes is a genus of ribbon worms belonging to the family Sacconemertidae. It was formerly placed in family Tetrastemmatidae.

The genus contains a single recognised species:

- Sacconemertes arenosa Karling, 1933
