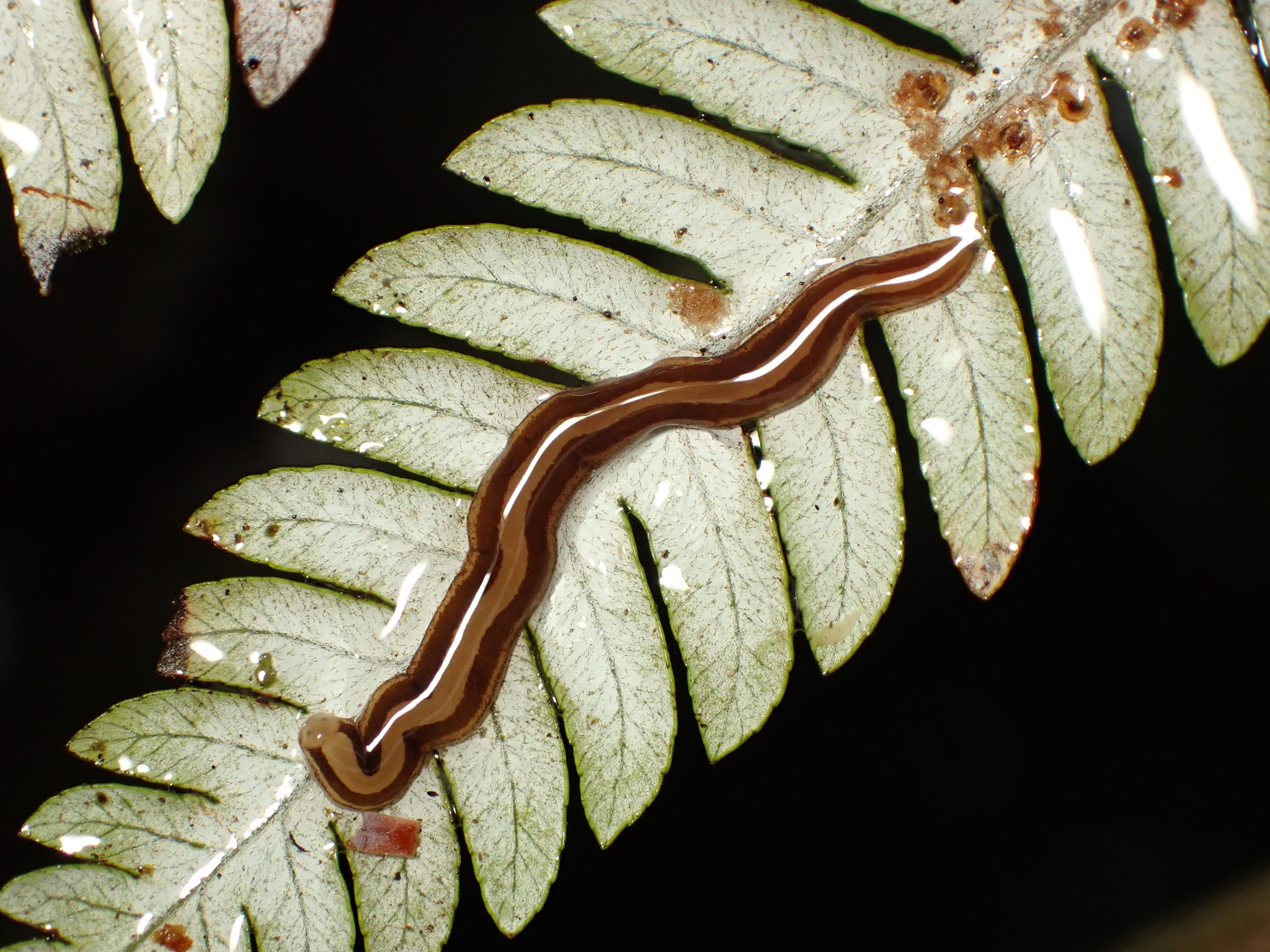

Scientific classification
- Domain: Eukaryota
- Kingdom: Animalia
- Phylum: Nemertea
- Class: Hoplonemertea
- Order: Monostilifera
- Family: Prosorhochmidae
- Genus: Antiponemertes
- Species: A. novaezealandiae

Binomial name
- Antiponemertes novaezealandiae (Dendy, 1895)

Synonyms
- Geonemertes novae-zealandiae Dendy, 1895

= Antiponemertes novaezealandiae =

Species of ribbon worm

Antiponemertes novaezealandiae is a species of Nemertean worm in the family Prosorhochmidae. The species is found in New Zealand.
