= Gononemertes australiensis =

Scientific classification
- Kingdom: Animalia
- Phylum: Nemertea
- Class: Hoplonemertea
- Order: Monostilifera
- Family: Prosorhochmidae
- Genus: Gononemertes
- Species: G. australiensis

Binomial name
- Gononemertes australiensis Gibson, 1974

Species of ribbon worm

Gononemertes australiensis is a parasitic ribbon worm. It lives commensally in the ascidian Pyura pachydermatina found in the sublittoral waters of the New Zealand. G. australiensis was found in specimens of P. pachydermatina collected in Sydney Harbour. (Note: The paper describing G. australiensis states the type specimen was collected in Sidney Harbor, although every paper published since states that the host ascidian, P. pachydermatina is only found in waters off the South Island of New Zealand.) These worms were found specifically in the atrium of P. pachydermatina. It is dioecious and has several gonads. Each of its gonads produce several oocytes while the male worms carry testes along its parenchyma. Fertilization is external.
