= Cyanophthalma =

Scientific classification
- Domain: Eukaryota
- Kingdom: Animalia
- Phylum: Nemertea
- Class: Hoplonemertea
- Order: Monostilifera
- Family: Tetrastemmatidae
- Genus: Cyanophthalma; Norenburg, 1986

Genus of worms

Cyanophthalma is a genus of ribbon worms belonging to the family Tetrastemmatidae.

The species of this genus are found in Europe and Northern America.

Species:

- Cyanophthalma cordiceps (Jensen, 1878)
- Cyanophthalma obscura (Schultze, 1851)
