= Pachynemertes =

Scientific classification
- Kingdom: Animalia
- Phylum: Nemertea
- Class: Hoplonemertea
- Order: Polystilifera
- Family: Pachynemertidae
- Genus: Pachynemertes; Coe, 1936
- Species: P. obesa

Binomial name
- Pachynemertes obesa Coe, 1936

Genus of ribbon worms

Pachynemertes is a monotypic genus of nemerteans belonging to the family Pachynemertidae. The only species is Pachynemertes obesa.
