= Prosorhochmus =

Scientific classification
- Kingdom: Animalia
- Phylum: Nemertea
- Class: Hoplonemertea
- Order: Monostilifera
- Family: Prosorhochmidae
- Genus: Prosorhochmus; Keferstein, 1862

Genus of ribbon worms

Prosorhochmus is a genus of worms belonging to the family Prosorhochmidae.

The species of this genus are found in Europe, the Americas.

Species:

- Prosorhochmus adriatica Senz, 1993
- Prosorhochmus albidus (Coe, 1905)
- Prosorhochmus americanus Gibson, Moore, Ruppert & Turbeville, 1986
- Prosorhochmus belizeanus
- Prosorhochmus chafarinensis Frutos, Montalvo & Junoy, 1998
- Prosorhochmus claparedii Keferstein, 1862
- Prosorhochmus nelsoni Sánchez, 1973
- Prosorhochmus subterraneus Friedrich, 1949
- Prosorhochmus viviparus (Ulyanin, 1870)
