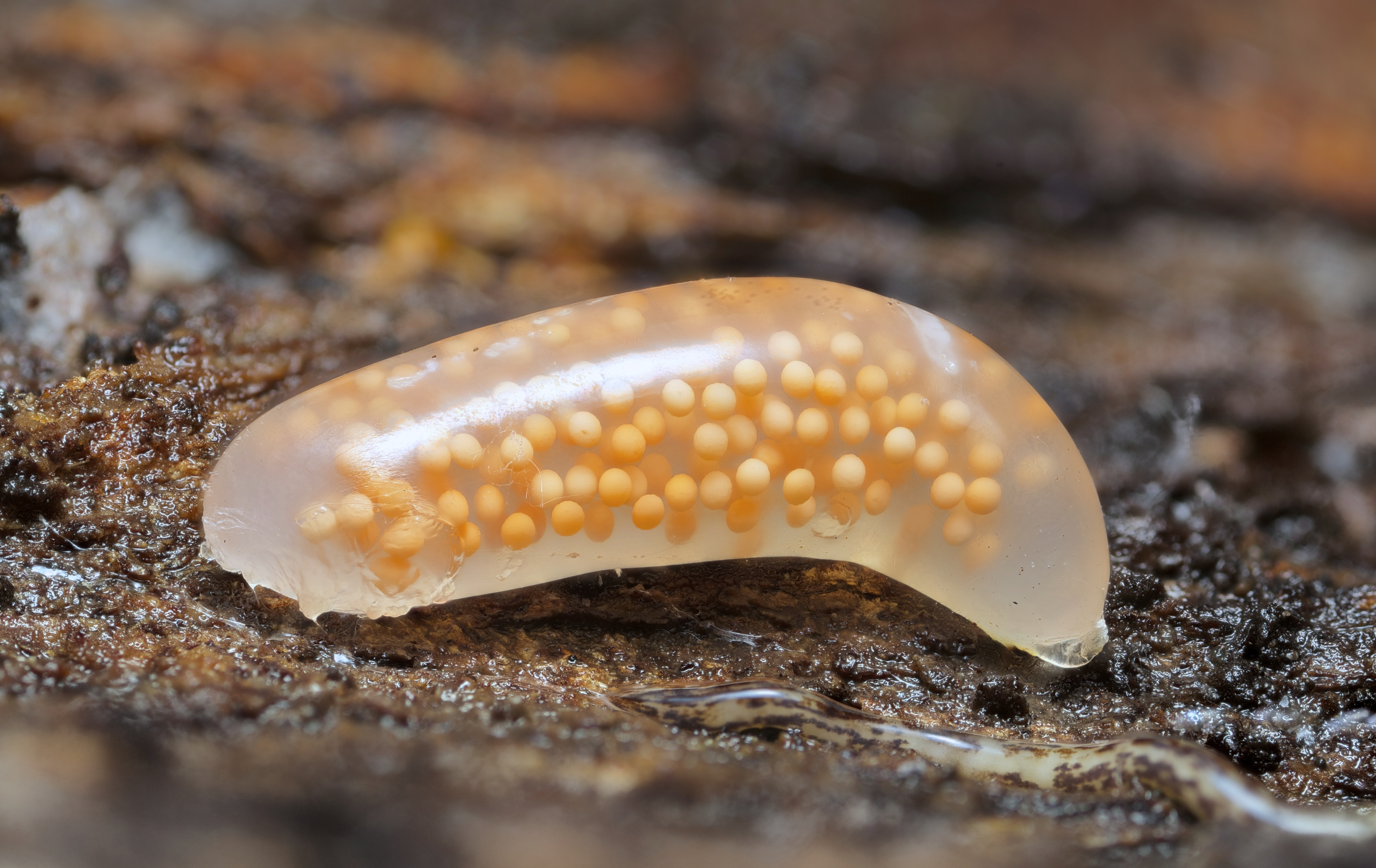
- Egg case of A. australiensis

Scientific classification
- Kingdom: Animalia
- Phylum: Nemertea
- Class: Hoplonemertea
- Order: Monostilifera
- Family: Acteonemertidae
- Genus: Argonemertes; Moore & Gibson, 1981

Species
- A. australiensis; A. dendyi; A. hillii; A. stocki

= Argonemertes =

Genus of ribbon worms

Argonemertes is a genus of nemertean worms belonging to the family Prosorhochmidae. It may be transferred to the family Plectonemertidae. The name is often misspelled as "Argononemertes" (e.g.).

== Species ==
- Argonemertes australiensis (Dendy, 1892)
- Argonemertes dendyi (Dakin, 1915)
- Argonemertes hillii (Hett, 1924)
- Argonemertes stocki (Moore, 1975)

All four species are terrestrial animals.
