= Arhochmus =

Scientific classification
- Kingdom: Animalia
- Phylum: Nemertea
- Class: Hoplonemertea
- Order: Monostilifera
- Family: Prosorhochmidae
- Genus: Arhochmus; Maslakova & Norenburg, 2008
- Species: A. korotneffi

Binomial name
- Arhochmus korotneffi (Bürger, 1895)

Genus of ribbon worms

Arhochmus is a monotypic genus of worms belonging to the family Prosorhochmidae. The only species is Arhochmus korotneffi.

The species is found in North America.
