= Dinonemertes =

Scientific classification
- Domain: Eukaryota
- Kingdom: Animalia
- Phylum: Nemertea
- Class: Hoplonemertea
- Order: Polystilifera
- Family: Dinonemertidae
- Genus: Dinonemertes; Laidlaw, 1906

Genus of ribbon worms

Dinonemertes is a genus of ribbon worms within the family Dinonemertidae.

== Species ==
- Dinonemertes alberti (Joubin, 1906)
- Dinonemertes arctica Korotkevich, 1977
- Dinonemertes grimaldii (Joubin, 1906)
- Dinonemertes investigatoris Laidlaw, 1906
- Dinonemertes mollis sensu Coe, 1926
- Dinonemertes shinkaii Kajihara & Lindsay, 2010
