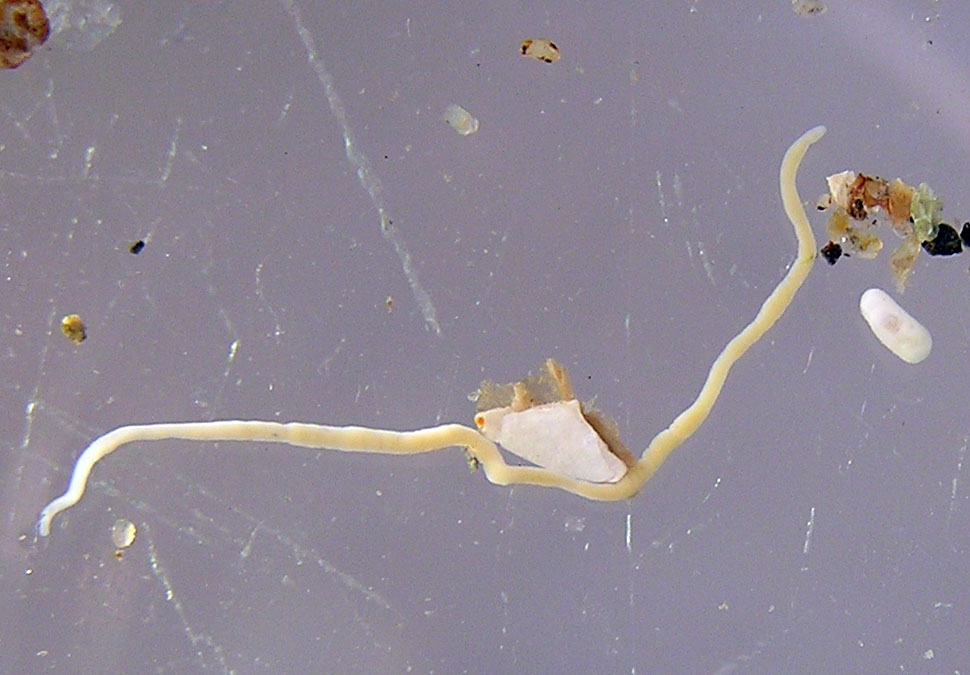
- Ototyphlonemertes valentinae

Scientific classification
- Kingdom: Animalia
- Phylum: Nemertea
- Class: Hoplonemertea
- Order: Monostilifera
- Family: Ototyphlonemertidae
- Genus: Ototyphlonemertes; Diesing, 1863

Species
- See text

= Ototyphlonemertes =

Genus of ribbon worms

Ototyphlonemertes is a genus of worms belonging to the family Ototyphlonemertidae. The distribution of members of this genus includes Eurasia.

== Species ==
Ototyphlonemertes includes the following species:

- Ototyphlonemertes americana Gerner, 1969
- Ototyphlonemertes ani Chernyshev, 2007
- Ototyphlonemertes antipai Müller, 1968
- Ototyphlonemertes aurantiaca (du Plessis, 1891)
- Ototyphlonemertes aurita (Uljanin, 1870)
- Ototyphlonemertes brevis Corrêa, 1948
- Ototyphlonemertes brunnea Bürger, 1895
- Ototyphlonemertes chernyshevi Kajihara, Tamura & Tomioka, 2018
- Ototyphlonemertes cirrula Mock & Schmidt, 1975
- Ototyphlonemertes claparedii (du Plessis, 1891)
- Ototyphlonemertes correae Envall, 1996
- Ototyphlonemertes dolichobasis Kajihara, 2007
- Ototyphlonemertes duplex Bürger, 1895
- Ototyphlonemertes envalli Kajihara, Tamura & Tomioka, 2018
- Ototyphlonemertes erneba Corrêa, 1950
- Ototyphlonemertes esulcata Senz, 1993
- Ototyphlonemertes evelinae Corrêa, 1948
- Ototyphlonemertes lactea Corrêa, 1953
- Ototyphlonemertes lei Kajihara, Tamura & Tomioka, 2018
- Ototyphlonemertes longissima Liu & Sun, 2018
- Ototyphlonemertes macintoshi Bürger, 1895
- Ototyphlonemertes martynovi Chernyshev, 1993
- Ototyphlonemertes nakaoae Kajihara, Tamura & Tomioka, 2018
- Ototyphlonemertes nikolaii Chernyshev, 1998
- Ototyphlonemertes norenburgi Kajihara, Tamura & Tomioka, 2018
- Ototyphlonemertes pallida (Keferstein, 1862)
- Ototyphlonemertes parmula Corrêa, 1950
- Ototyphlonemertes pellucida Coe, 1943
- Ototyphlonemertes santacruzensis Mock & Schmidt, 1975
- Ototyphlonemertes spiralis Coe, 1940
- Ototyphlonemertes tsukagoshii Kajihara, Tamura & Tomioka, 2018
- Ototyphlonemertes valentinae Chernyshev, 2003
- Ototyphlonemertes victoriae Stiasny-Wijnhoff, 1942
