= Valdivianemertes =

Scientific classification
- Domain: Eukaryota
- Kingdom: Animalia
- Phylum: Nemertea
- Class: Hoplonemertea
- Order: Monostilifera
- Family: Cratenemertidae
- Genus: Valdivianemertes; Stiasny-Wijnhoff, 1923

Genus of ribbon worms

Valdivianemertes is a genus of nemerteans belonging to the family Cratenemertidae.

The species of this genus are found in near Antarctica.

Species:

- Valdivianemertes stannii (Grube, 1840)
- Valdivianemertes valdiviae (Bürger, 1909)
