= Geonemertes pelaensis =

- Video file: Geonemertes pelaensis killing a spider. Observe proboscis at end of movie.

Scientific classification
- Kingdom: Animalia
- Phylum: Nemertea
- Class: Hoplonemertea
- Order: Monostilifera
- Family: Prosorhochmidae
- Genus: Geonemertes
- Species: G. pelaensis

Binomial name
- Geonemertes pelaensis Semper, 1863

Synonyms
- Geonemertes arboricola Punnett, 1907; Geonemertes vinsoni Moore in Pantin, 1969

Species of worm

Geonemertes pelaensis is a species of terrestrial Nemertea. Superficially, Geonemertes pelaensis resembles a land flatworm (family Geoplanidae) and lives in the same habitat, but it has an anterior exertile proboscis, whereas flatworms have a pharynx located in their ventral side at midlength of body. The number of eyes this nemertean can have varies between 4 and 8 ocelli.

It is commonly found on islands in the Indo-Pacific, and has been anthropogenically introduced to Caribbean islands and Florida. Geonemertes pelaensis is a known predator of gastropoda in the wild, and isopoda, and amphipoda in laboratory settings.

== Molecular characterization ==
The complete mitochondrial genome of Geonemertes pelaensis was sequenced from specimens collected in Martinique and New Caledonia. The mitogenome was unusually large, nearly 32 kb, and contained 13 protein-coding genes, two rRNA genes, and 21 tRNA genes. The two genomes were almost identical, differing by only a few mutations, indicating low genetic diversity. This conservation suggests a recent introduction from closely related source populations. The exceptional genome length was mainly due to long intergenic regions and expanded tRNA clusters. Several nuclear mitochondrial pseudogenes (NUMTs) were detected, which may complicate genetic analyses. Gut content sequencing also revealed prey DNA, (a cockroach for the specimen from Martinique, and a moth for the specimen from New Caledonia) demonstrating the ecological value of molecular approaches.
