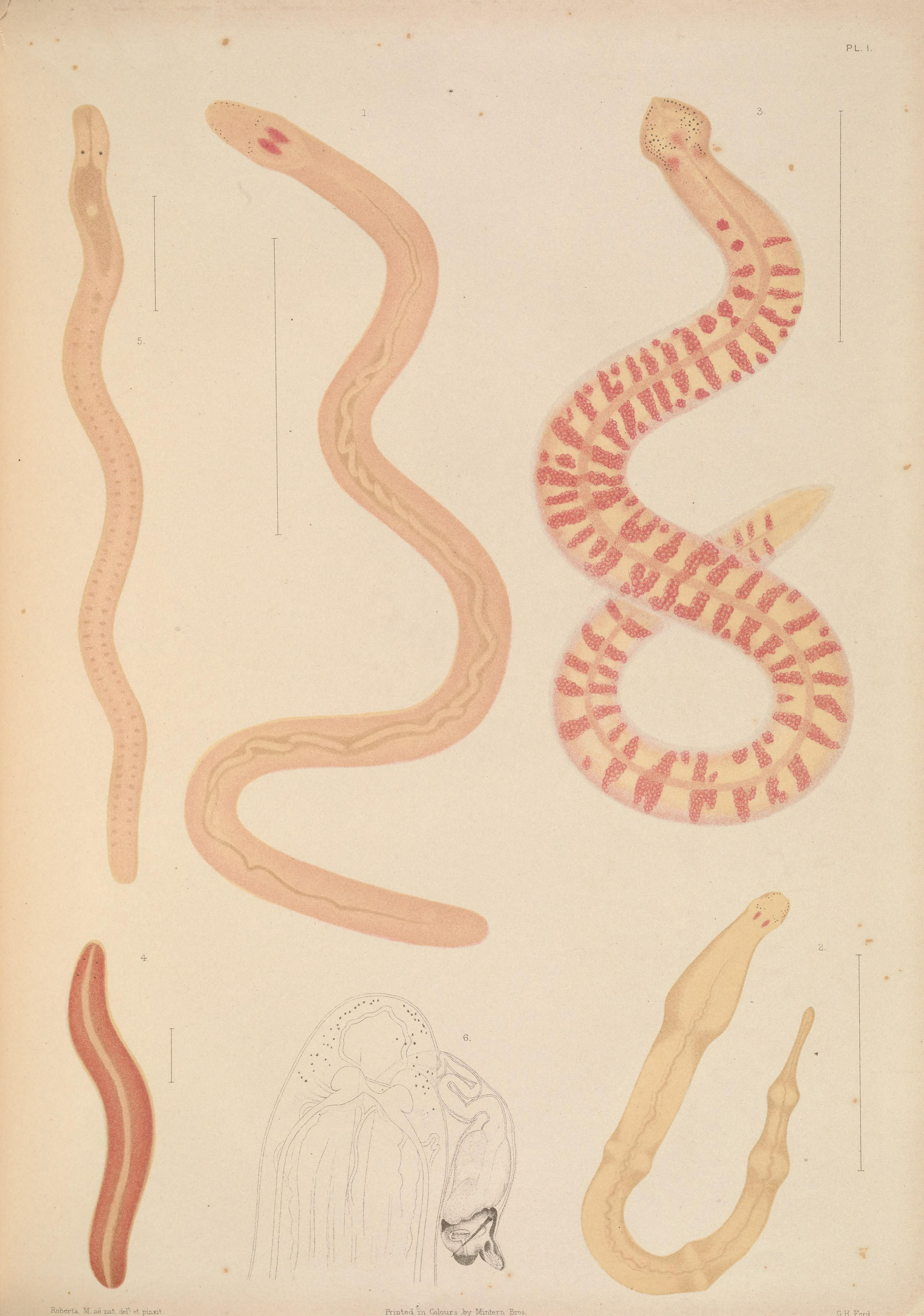
- A monograph of the British marine annelids. Plate text 1, 2 Amphiporus lactifloreus Johnston, 1828 3 Amphiporus pulchra = Nipponnemertes pulchra (Johnston, 1837) 4 Tetrastemma dorsalis = Oerstedia dorsalis (Abildgaard, 1806) 5 Nemertes carcinophila = Carcinonemertes carcinophila (Kölliker, 1845) 6 Nemertes gracilis = Emplectonema gracile (Johnston, 1837)

Scientific classification
- Kingdom: Animalia
- Phylum: Nemertea
- Class: Hoplonemertea
- Order: Monostilifera
- Family: Cratenemertidae
- Genus: Nipponnemertes; Friedrich, 1968

= Nipponnemertes =

Genus of worms

Nipponnemertes is a genus of worms belonging to the family Cratenemertidae.

The genus has cosmopolitan distribution.

Species:

- Nipponnemertes africanus (Wheeler, 1940)
- Nipponnemertes arenaria (Ushakov, 1927)
- Nipponnemertes bimaculata Iwata, 1954
- Nipponnemertes danae (Friedrich, 1957)
- Nipponnemertes drepanophoroides (Griffin, 1898)
- Nipponnemertes fernaldi Iwata, 2001
- Nipponnemertes incainca Gonzalez-Cueto, Castro & Quiroga, 2017
- Nipponnemertes madagascarensis (Kirsteuer, 1965)
- Nipponnemertes magnus (Punnett, 1903)
- Nipponnemertes marioni (Hubrecht, 1887)
- Nipponnemertes occidentalis (Coe, 1905)
- Nipponnemertes ogumai (Yamaoka, 1947)
- Nipponnemertes pacificus (Coe, 1905)
- Nipponnemertes pulcher (Johnston, 1837)
- Nipponnemertes pulchra (Johnston, 1837)
- Nipponnemertes punctatula (Coe, 1905)
- Nipponnemertes rubella Coe, 1905
- Nipponnemertes sanguinea Riser, 1998
- Nipponnemertes schollaerti (Wheeler, 1934)
- Nipponnemertes variabilis (Korotkevich, 1983)
