= Cyanonemertes =

Scientific classification
- Kingdom: Animalia
- Phylum: Nemertea
- Class: Hoplonemertea
- Order: Monostilifera
- Suborder: Eumonostilifera
- Genus: Cyanonemertes; Iwata, 2007

Species
- Cyanonemertes elegans Iwata, 2007

Genus of ribbon worms

Cyanonemertes is a genus of marine nemertean worms in the suborder Monostilifera. Cyanonemertes elegans, the sole species in the genus, is from Washington state, U.S.A.
