= Gononemertes =

Scientific classification
- Domain: Eukaryota
- Kingdom: Animalia
- Phylum: Nemertea
- Class: Hoplonemertea
- Order: Monostilifera
- Family: Prosorhochmidae
- Genus: Gononemertes; Bergendal, 1900

Species
- G. australiensis; G. parasita

Genus of ribbon worms

Gononemertes is a genus of parasitic worms.

== Species ==
- Gononemertes australiensis Gibson, 1974
- Gononemertes parasita Bergendal, 1900
