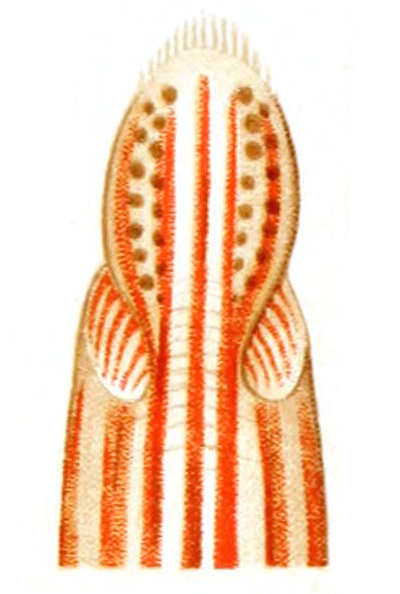
- Brinkmannia mediterranea

Scientific classification
- Kingdom: Animalia
- Phylum: Nemertea
- Class: Hoplonemertea
- Order: Polystilifera
- Family: Brinkmanniidae
- Genus: Brinkmannia; Stiasny-Wijnhoff, 1926
- Species: B. mediterranea

Binomial name
- Brinkmannia mediterranea Stiasny-Wijnhoff, 1926

= Brinkmannia =

Genus of ribbon worms

Brinkmannia is a monotypic genus of worms belonging to the family Brinkmanniidae. The only species is Brinkmannia mediterranea.
