= Drepanophoridae =

Scientific classification
- Domain: Eukaryota
- Kingdom: Animalia
- Phylum: Nemertea
- Class: Hoplonemertea
- Order: Polystilifera
- Superfamily: Aequifurcata
- Family: Drepanophoridae

Family of worms

Drepanophoridae is a family of worms belonging to the order Hoplonemertea.

== Genera ==
Genera:

- Bergia Bürger, 1890
- Curranemertes Kirsteuer, 1978
- Drepanophoriella Senz, 1993
- Drepanophorina Stiasny- Wijnhoff, 1936
- Drepanophorus Hubrecht, 1874
- Gibsonnemertes Härlin, 1998
- Hirohitonemertes Crandall, Norenburg, Chernyshev, Maslakova, Schwartz, & Kajihara, 2002
- Kameginemertes Iwata, 1998
- Polyschista Wijnhoff, 1925
- Punnettia Stiasny-Wijnhoff, 1926
- Wijnhoffella Friedrich, 1940
- Wijnhoffia Härlin, 1998
