= Ototyphlonemertidae =

Scientific classification
- Domain: Eukaryota
- Kingdom: Animalia
- Phylum: Nemertea
- Class: Hoplonemertea
- Order: Monostilifera
- Suborder: Eumonostilifera
- Family: Ototyphlonemertidae

Family of ribbon worms

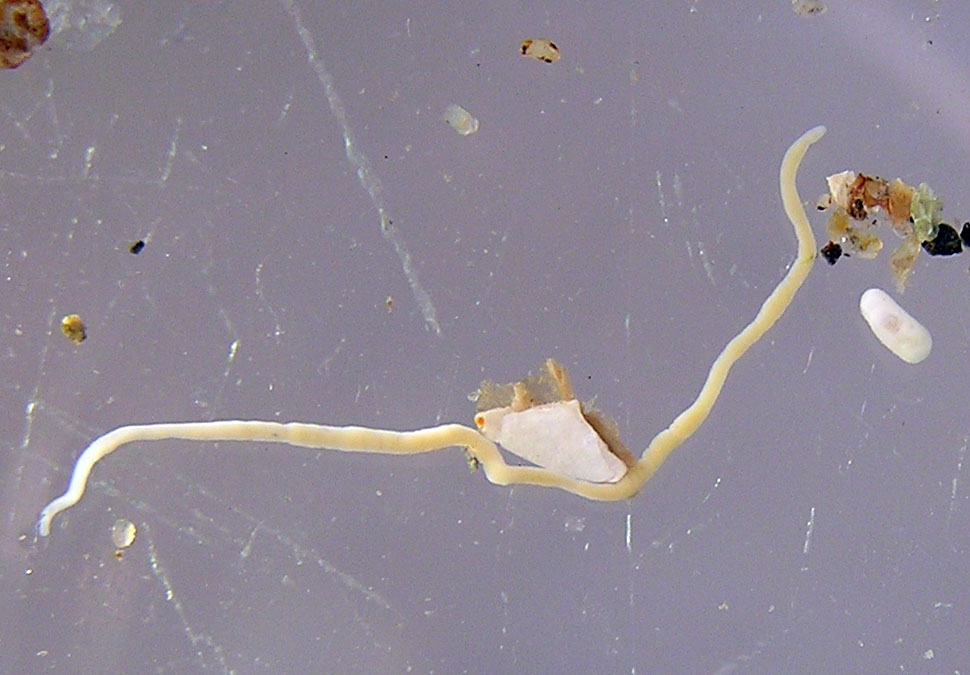

Ototyphlonemertidae is a family of worms belonging to the suborder Monostilifera.

Genera:

- Accirinia Tshernyshev, 1993
- Otohelicophora Envall, 1996
- Otonemertes Dawydoff, 1937
- Ototyphlonemertes Diesing, 1863
