= Paradinonemertes =

Scientific classification
- Kingdom: Animalia
- Phylum: Nemertea
- Class: Hoplonemertea
- Order: Polystilifera
- Family: Dinonemertidae
- Genus: Paradinonemertes; Brinkmann, 1915

Genus of ribbon worms

Paradinonemertes is a genus of worms belonging to the family Dinonemertidae.

The species of this genus are found in Central America.

Species:

- Paradinonemertes drygalskii Brinkmann, 1915
- Paradinonemertes macrostomum Coe, 1954
