= Paradrepanophorus =

Scientific classification
- Kingdom: Animalia
- Phylum: Nemertea
- Class: Hoplonemertea
- Order: Polystilifera
- Family: Paradrepanophoridae
- Genus: Paradrepanophorus; Stiasny-Wijnhoff, 1926

Genus of ribbon worms

Paradrepanophorus is a genus of worms belonging to the family Paradrepanophoridae.

The species of this genus are found in Europe.

Species:

- Paradrepanophorus corallinicola Stiasny-Wijnhoff, 1926
- Paradrepanophorus crassus (Quatrefages, 1846)
- Paradrepanophorus nisidensis (Hubrecht, 1875)
- Paradrepanophorus obiensis Stiasny-Wijnhoff, 1936
- Paradrepanophorus stephensoni Wheeler, 1940
