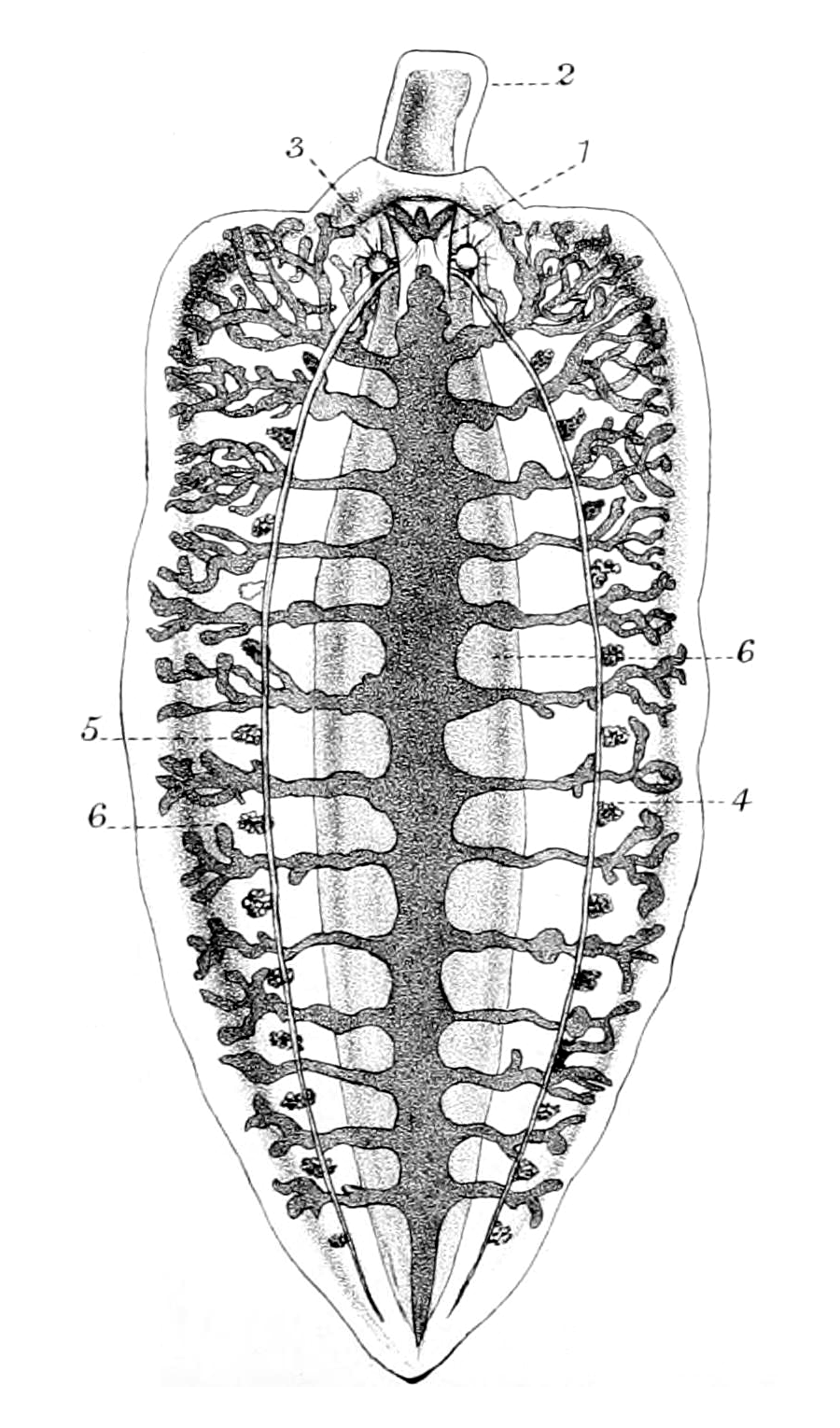
- Pelagonemertes rollestoni

Scientific classification
- Kingdom: Animalia
- Phylum: Nemertea
- Class: Hoplonemertea
- Order: Polystilifera
- Family: Pelagonemertidae
- Genus: Pelagonemertes; Moseley, 1875

= Pelagonemertes =

Genus of ribbon worms

Pelagonemertes is a genus of pelagic nemertean belonging to the family Pelagonemertidae.

The species of this genus are found in almost all world oceans.

Species:

- Pelagonemertes brinkmanni Coe, 1926
- Pelagonemertes excisa Korotkevich, 1955
- Pelagonemertes joubini Coe, 1926
- Pelagonemertes korotkevitschae Friedrich, 1969
- Pelagonemertes laticauda Korotkevich, 1955
- Pelagonemertes moseleyi Bürger, 1895
- Pelagonemertes oviporus Korotkevich, 1955
- Pelagonemertes rollestoni Moseley, 1875
