= Balaenanemertidae =

Scientific classification
- Domain: Eukaryota
- Kingdom: Animalia
- Phylum: Nemertea
- Class: Hoplonemertea
- Order: Polystilifera
- Suborder: Pelagica
- Family: Balaenanemertidae

Family of ribbon worms

Balaenanemertidae is a family of worms belonging to the order Polystilifera.

Genera:

- Balaenanemertes Bürger, 1909
