= Siboganemertidae =

Scientific classification
- Domain: Eukaryota
- Kingdom: Animalia
- Phylum: Nemertea
- Class: Hoplonemertea
- Order: Polystilifera
- Infraorder: Archireptantia
- Family: Siboganemertidae

Family of ribbon worms

Siboganemertidae is a family of worms belonging to the order Polystilifera.

Genera:

- Sagaminemertes Friedrich, 1968
- Siboganemertes Stiasny-Wijnhoff, 1923
