= Brinkmanniidae =

Scientific classification
- Domain: Eukaryota
- Kingdom: Animalia
- Phylum: Nemertea
- Class: Hoplonemertea
- Order: Polystilifera
- Superfamily: Aequifurcata
- Family: Brinkmanniidae

Family of ribbon worms

Brinkmanniidae is a family of worms belonging to the order Polystilifera.

Genera:

- Brinkmannia Stiasny-Wijnhoff, 1926
