= Geonemertes =

Scientific classification
- Kingdom: Animalia
- Phylum: Nemertea
- Class: Hoplonemertea
- Order: Monostilifera
- Family: Prosorhochmidae
- Genus: Geonemertes; Semper, 1863

Genus of ribbon worms

Geonemertes is a genus of nemerteans belonging to the family Prosorhochmidae.

The species of this genus are found all over the world.

Species:

- Geonemertes caeca Darbishire, 1909
- Geonemertes graffi Bürger, 1896
- Geonemertes pelaensis Semper, 1863
- Geonemertes peradeniya Pantin, 1961
- Geonemertes philippinensis Gibson & Moore, 1998
- †Geonemertes rodericana (Gulliver, 1879)
- Geonemertes spirospermia Darbishire, 1909
