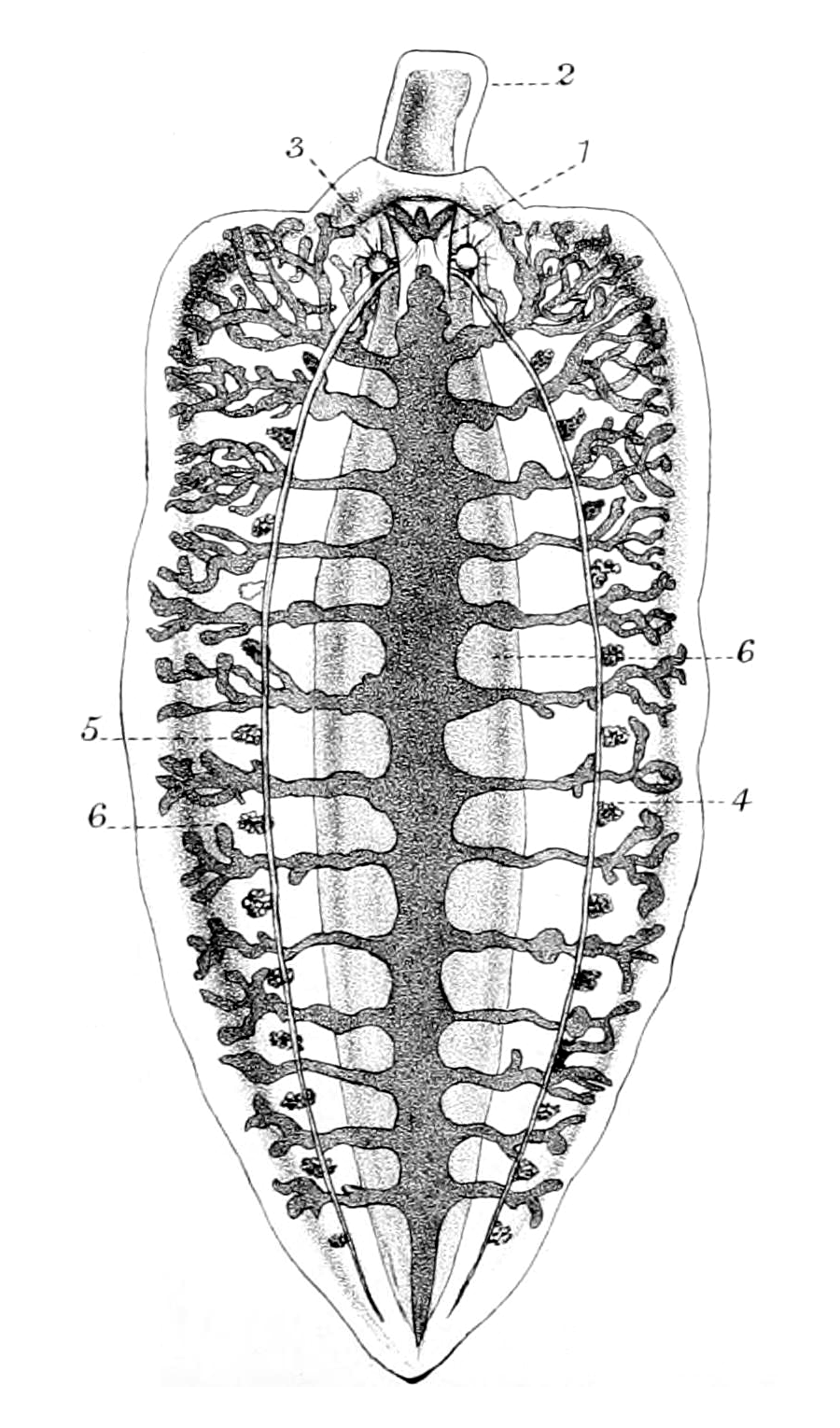
- Pelagonemertes rollestoni

Scientific classification
- Domain: Eukaryota
- Kingdom: Animalia
- Phylum: Nemertea
- Class: Hoplonemertea
- Order: Polystilifera
- Suborder: Pelagica
- Family: Pelagonemertidae

= Pelagonemertidae =

Family of ribbon worms

Pelagonemertidae is a family of pelagic nemerteans belonging to the order Polystilifera.

== Genera ==
Genera:

- Cuneonemertes Coe, 1926
- Gelanemertes Coe, 1926
- Loranemertes Chernyshev, 1992
- Nannonemertes Wheeler, 1936
- Natonemertes Brinkmann, 1917
- Obnemertes Korotkevich, 1960
- Parabalaenanemertes Brinkmann, 1917
- Pelagonemertes Moseley, 1875
- Probalaenanemertes Brinkmann, 1917
