= Phallonemertes =

Scientific classification
- Kingdom: Animalia
- Phylum: Nemertea
- Class: Hoplonemertea
- Order: Polystilifera
- Family: Phallonemertidae; Brinkmann, 1917
- Genus: Phallonemertes; Brinkmann, 1917
- Species: P. murrayi

Binomial name
- Phallonemertes murrayi (Brinkmann, 1912)

Genus of ribbon worms

Phallonemertes is a monotypic genus of worms belonging to the monotypic family Phallonemertidae. The only species is Phallonemertes murrayi.

The species is found in Pacific Ocean near Western America.

== Etymology ==
The worm is named for Sir John Murray.
