= Chuniella =

Chuniella may refer to:

- Chuniella (worm), a genus of worms in the family Chuniellidae
- Chuniella (alga), a genus of algae in the class Bacillariophyceae, order and family unassigned
