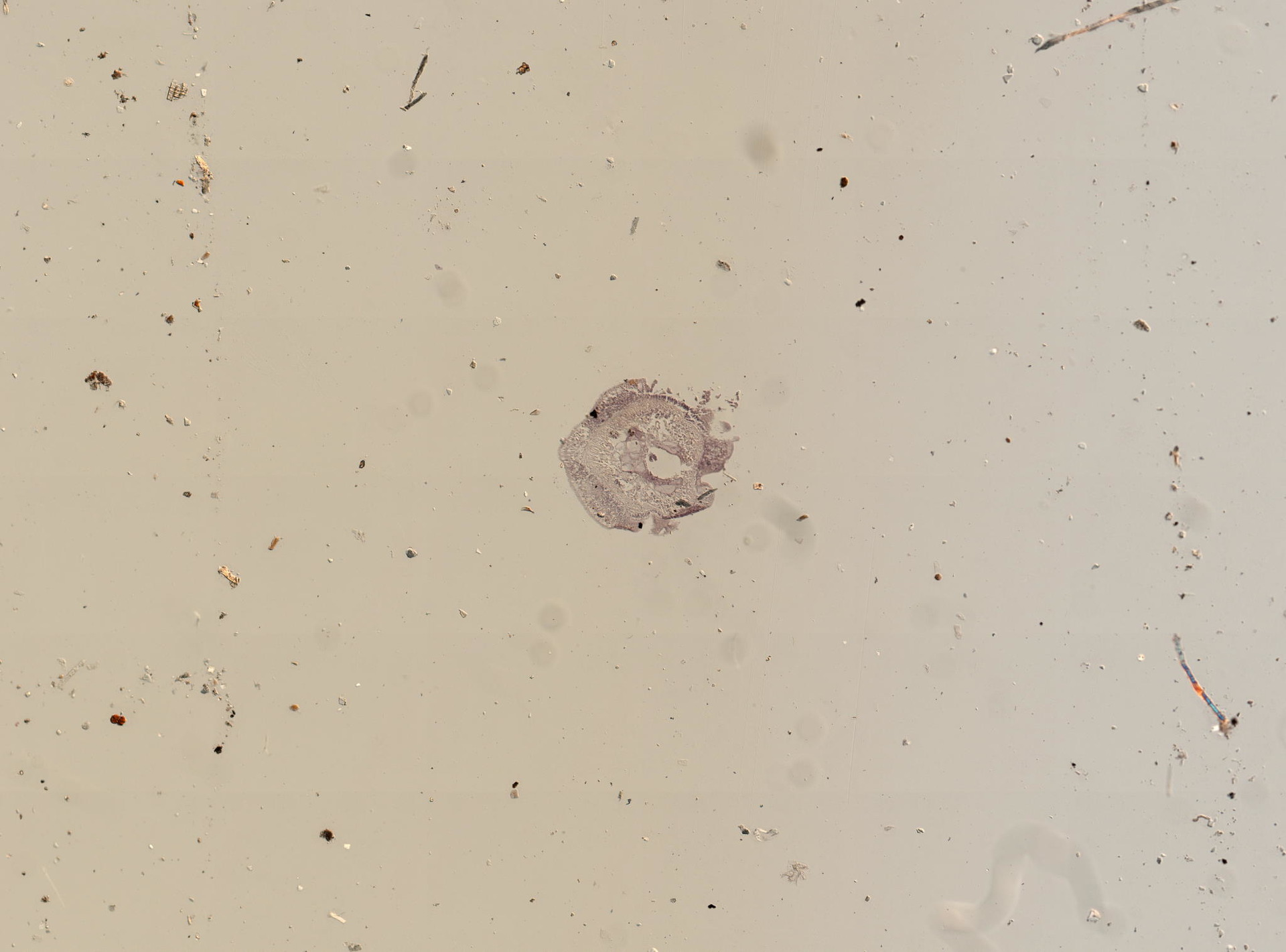
- Preserved specimen of Tetrastemma

Scientific classification
- Kingdom: Animalia
- Phylum: Nemertea
- Class: Hoplonemertea
- Order: Monostilifera
- Family: Tetrastemmatidae
- Genus: Tetrastemma; Ehrenberg, 1831

= Tetrastemma =

Genus of ribbon worms

Tetrastemma is a genus of nemerteans belonging to the family Tetrastemmatidae.

The genus has cosmopolitan distribution.

== Species ==
Species:

- Tetrastemma aberrans Coe, 1901
- Tetrastemma aequicolor Chernyshev, 2024
- Tetrastemma albomaculatum Chernyshev, 2016
- Tetrastemma album Hookabe, Kohtsuka, Fujiwara, Tsuchida & Ueshima, 2023
- Tetrastemma ambiguum Riches, 1893
- Tetrastemma amphiporoides Bürger, 1893
- Tetrastemma angulatus Senz, 1993
- Tetrastemma antarcticum Bürger, 1893
- Tetrastemma appendiculatum Chernyshev, 1998
- Tetrastemma aseptata (Friedrich, 1935)
- Tetrastemma assimile Örsted, 1844
- Tetrastemma bacescui Müller, 1962
- Tetrastemma baculus (Quatrefages, 1846)
- Tetrastemma basinum Corrêa, 1957
- Tetrastemma beaumonti (Southern, 1913)
- Tetrastemma benedeni Czerniavsky, 1880
- Tetrastemma bicolor Coe, 1901
- Tetrastemma bilineatum Coe, 1904
- Tetrastemma bioculatum Örsted, 1843
- Tetrastemma bistriatum (Timofeeva, 1912)
- Tetrastemma brunneum (Friedrich, 1935)
- Tetrastemma buxeum Bürger, 1895
- Tetrastemma candidum (Müller, 1774)
- Tetrastemma carneum Hookabe, Oya, Tsuchida, Fujiwara & Ueshima, 2023
- Tetrastemma cerasinum Bürger, 1895
- Tetrastemma cincum Corrêa, 1957
- Tetrastemma coronatum (Quatrefages, 1846)
- Tetrastemma cruciatum Bürger, 1895
- Tetrastemma cupido Hookabe, Kohtsuka & Kajihara, 2021
- Tetrastemma diadema Hubrecht, 1879
- Tetrastemma dubium Örsted, 1845
- Tetrastemma duboisi Bürger, 1893
- Tetrastemma dutoiti (Wheeler, 1940)
- Tetrastemma elegans (Girard, 1852)
- Tetrastemma elongatum (Stephenson, 1911)
- Tetrastemma enteroplecta (Corrêa, 1954)
- Tetrastemma falsum Bürger, 1895
- Tetrastemma flavidum Ehrenberg, 1828
- Tetrastemma fozense Gibson & Junoy, 1991
- Tetrastemma freyae Chernyshev, Polyakova, Vignesh, Jain, Sanjeevi, Norenburg & Rajesh, 2020
- Tetrastemma fulvum Kirsteuer, 1963
- Tetrastemma georgianum Bürger, 1893
- Tetrastemma glanduliferum Bürger, 1895
- Tetrastemma hansi Bürger, 1893
- Tetrastemma hermaphroditicum (Keferstein, 1868)
- Tetrastemma herouardi (Oxner, 1908)
- Tetrastemma herthae Corrêa, 1963
- Tetrastemma humile (Quatrefages, 1846)
- Tetrastemma incisum Stimpson, 1855
- Tetrastemma insolens Iwata, 1952
- Tetrastemma interruptum
- Tetrastemma jeani McCaul, 1963
- Tetrastemma kangauzi Chernyshev, 2003
- Tetrastemma kefersteinii (Marion, 1869)
- Tetrastemma kirsteueri Senz, 1995
- Tetrastemma knochii (Kölliker, 1845)
- Tetrastemma laminariae Ushakov, 1928
- Tetrastemma leonillae (Oxner, 1908)
- Tetrastemma lilianae Corrêa, 1958
- Tetrastemma longissimum Bürger, 1895
- Tetrastemma longistriatum Wheeler, 1934
- Tetrastemma lophoheliae Bergendal, 1903
- Tetrastemma maculatum (Timofeeva, 1912)
- Tetrastemma maivikenensis Wheeler, 1934
- Tetrastemma marionis Joubin, 1890
- Tetrastemma melanocephalum (Johnston, 1837)
- Tetrastemma merula (Corrêa, 1954)
- Tetrastemma microocelli (Sun, 1995)
- Tetrastemma mixtum (Timofeeva, 1912)
- Tetrastemma montagui Senz, 2001
- Tetrastemma nanum Corrêa, 1957
- Tetrastemma nigrifrons Coe, 1904
- Tetrastemma nigrolineatum Wheeler, 1934
- Tetrastemma nimbatum Bürger, 1895
- Tetrastemma oerstedi Senz, 2001
- Tetrastemma olgarum Chernyshev, 1998
- Tetrastemma omicron Joubin, 1902
- Tetrastemma parallelos Abato, Yoshida & Kajihara, 2022
- Tetrastemma persona Hookabe, Kohtsuka, Fujiwara, Tsuchida & Ueshima, 2023
- Tetrastemma phaeobasisae Kulikova, 1987
- Tetrastemma pimaculatum Chernyshev, 1998
- Tetrastemma pinnatum Iwata, 1954
- Tetrastemma piolinum Corrêa, 1957
- Tetrastemma polyakovae Sagorny, von Döhren, Rouse & Tilic, 2022
- Tetrastemma portus Bürger, 1895
- Tetrastemma primum Corrêa, 1954
- Tetrastemma pseudocoronatum Chernyshev, 1998
- Tetrastemma quadrilineatum Coe, 1904
- Tetrastemma quadristriatum Langerhans, 1880
- Tetrastemma quadristriatum Grube, 1869
- Tetrastemma quatrefagesi (Bürger, 1904)
- Tetrastemma reticulatum Coe, 1904
- Tetrastemma robertianae McIntosh, 1874
- Tetrastemma rollandi Joubin, 1905
- Tetrastemma roseocephalum (Yamaoka, 1947)
- Tetrastemma roseum Verrill, 1892
- Tetrastemma schultzei Czerniavsky, 1880
- Tetrastemma scutelliferum Bürger, 1895
- Tetrastemma sexlineatum Coe, 1940
- Tetrastemma shohoense Hookabe, Kohtsuka, Fujiwara, Tsuchida & Ueshima, 2023
- Tetrastemma signifer Coe, 1904
- Tetrastemma simplex (Timofeev, 1911)
- Tetrastemma stanleyi Wheeler, 1934
- Tetrastemma stimpsoni Chernyshev, 1992
- Tetrastemma strandae Sagorny, von Döhren, Rouse & Tilic, 2022
- Tetrastemma subpellucidum Örsted, 1843
- Tetrastemma suhmi (Bürger, 1904)
- Tetrastemma sundbergi Sagorny, von Döhren, Rouse & Tilic, 2022
- Tetrastemma tanikelyensis Kirsteuer, 1965
- Tetrastemma tristibruna Sundberg & Gibson, 1995
- Tetrastemma turdum Corrêa, 1957
- Tetrastemma tutus (Monastero, 1930)
- Tetrastemma unicolor (Hubrecht, 1879)
- Tetrastemma vastum Bürger, 1895
- Tetrastemma verinigrum Iwata, 1954
- Tetrastemma vermiculus (Quatrefages, 1846)
- Tetrastemma verrilli (Bürger, 1904)
- Tetrastemma viera (Timofeev, 1911)
- Tetrastemma viperula (Timofeev, 1911)
- Tetrastemma virgatum Kirsteuer, 1963
- Tetrastemma vittigerum (Bürger, 1904)
- Tetrastemma weddelli Wheeler, 1934
- Tetrastemma wilsoni Coe, 1943
- Tetrastemma worki Corrêa, 1961}
