= Drepanogigantidae =

Scientific classification
- Domain: Eukaryota
- Kingdom: Animalia
- Phylum: Nemertea
- Class: Hoplonemertea
- Order: Polystilifera
- Superfamily: Inaequifurcata
- Family: Drepanogigantidae

Family of worms

Drepanogigantidae is a family of worms belonging to the order Polystilifera.

Genera:

- Drepanogigas Stiasny-Wijnhoff, 1926
