= Drepanophorus (worm) =

Scientific classification
- Kingdom: Animalia
- Phylum: Nemertea
- Class: Hoplonemertea
- Order: Polystilifera
- Family: Drepanophoridae
- Genus: Drepanophorus; Hubrecht, 1874

Genus of worms

Drepanophorus is a genus of worms belonging to the family Drepanophoridae.

The genus has almost cosmopolitan distribution.

Species:

- Drepanophorus cerinus
- Drepanophorus crassus (Quatrefages, 1846)
- Drepanophorus edwardsi Joubin, 1902
- Drepanophorus gravieri Joubin, 1904
- Drepanophorus massiliensis Joubin, 1894
- Drepanophorus modestus Stiasny-Wijnhoff, 1923
- Drepanophorus ritteri Coe, 1905
- Drepanophorus rubrostriatus Hubrecht, 1875
- Drepanophorus serraticollis (Hubrecht, 1874)
