= Protopelagonemertidae =

Scientific classification
- Domain: Eukaryota
- Kingdom: Animalia
- Phylum: Nemertea
- Class: Hoplonemertea
- Order: Polystilifera
- Suborder: Pelagica
- Family: Protopelagonemertidae

Family of ribbon worms

Protopelagonemertidae is a family of worms belonging to the order Polystilifera.

Genera:

- Calonemertes Coe, 1945
- Pendonemertes Brinkmann, 1917
- Plotonemertes Brinkmann, 1917
- Protopelagonemertes Brinkmann, 1917
