= Cratenemertidae =

Scientific classification
- Domain: Eukaryota
- Kingdom: Animalia
- Phylum: Nemertea
- Class: Hoplonemertea
- Order: Monostilifera
- Suborder: Cratenemertea
- Family: Cratenemertidae

Family of ribbon worms

Cratenemertidae is a family of worms belonging to the order Hoplonemertea.

Genera:

- Achoronemertes Crandall & Gibson, 1998
- Cratenemertes Friedrich, 1955
- Korotkevitschia Friedrich, 1968
- Nipponemertes Friedrich, 1968
- Nipponnemertes Friedrich, 1968
- Valdivianemertes Stiasny-Wijnhoff, 1923
