= Planktonemertidae =

Scientific classification
- Domain: Eukaryota
- Kingdom: Animalia
- Phylum: Nemertea
- Class: Hoplonemertea
- Order: Polystilifera
- Suborder: Pelagica
- Family: Planktonemertidae

Family of ribbon worms

Planktonemertidae is a family of worms belonging to the order Polystilifera.

Genera:

- Crassonemertes Brinkmann, 1917
- Mergonemertes Brinkmann, 1917
- Mononemertes Coe, 1926
- Neuronemertes Coe, 1926
- Planktonemertes Woodworth, 1899
- Plenanemertes Coe, 1954
- Tononemertes Coe, 1954
