= Uniporus =

Scientific classification
- Domain: Eukaryota
- Kingdom: Animalia
- Phylum: Nemertea
- Class: Hoplonemertea
- Order: Polystilifera
- Family: Uniporidae
- Genus: Uniporus; Brinkmann, 1914

Genus of worms

Uniporus is a genus of worms belonging to the monotypic family Uniporidae.

The species of this genus are found in Subarctic regions.

Species:

- Uniporus acutocaudatus Brinkmann, 1914-1915
- Uniporus alisae Chernyshev & Polyakova, 2017
- Uniporus borealis (Punnett, 1901)
- Uniporus hyalinus Brinkmann, 1914/15
