= Drepanophorus =

Drepanophorus may refer to:

- Drepanophorus (worm), a genus of worms in the family Drepanophoridae
- Drepanophorus, a genus of worms in the family Aporcelaimidae, synonym of Paraxonchium
- Drepanophorus, a genus of birds in the family Paradisaeidae, synonym of Drepanornis
