= Chuniella (worm) =

Scientific classification
- Domain: Eukaryota
- Kingdom: Animalia
- Phylum: Nemertea
- Class: Hoplonemertea
- Order: Polystilifera
- Family: Chuniellidae
- Genus: Chuniella; Brinkmann, 1917

Genus of ribbon worms

Chuniella is a genus of nemerteans belonging to the family Chuniellidae.

The species of this genus are found in America.

Species:

- Chuniella agassizii (Bürger, 1909)
- Chuniella compacta Korotkevich, 1964
- Chuniella elongata (Joubin, 1906)
- Chuniella lanceolata Brinkmann, 1917
- Chuniella pelagica (Bürger, 1909)
- Chuniella tenella Coe, 1954
