= Moeangiangi River =

River in New Zealand

- Route of the Moeangiangi River
- Mouth of the Moeangiangi River Moeangiangi River (North Island)
- Native name: Moeangiangi (Māori)

Location
- Country: New Zealand
- Island: North Island
- Region: Hawke's Bay
- District: Hastings Taupo

Physical characteristics
- Source: Rocky Range
  - coordinates: 39.20645°S 176.95181°E
- Mouth: Hawke Bay
  - coordinates: 39°14′45″S 177°01′19″E
- Length: 14 km (8.7 mi)

Basin features
- Progression: Moeangiangi River → Hawke Bay → Pacific Ocean
- River system: Hawke Bay
- Tributaries
  - left: Kiakia Stream

The Moeangiangi River is a river of the Hawke's Bay region of New Zealand's North Island. It flows east from Rocky Range to the east of Lake Tutira to reach Hawke Bay 25 kilometres (16 mi) north of Napier.

== Biodiversity ==
The coastal cliff margins of the Moeangiangi River are dominated by native scrubland, including mānuka, harakeke flax, and tauhinu.

== History ==
The river mouth is a traditional food harvesting area for Maungaharuru Tangitū-associated hapū of Ngāti Kahungunu. Traditional fishing grounds off the coast of the Moeangiangi River mouth, where hāpuku, moki, tarakihi werecaught, and kaiō (sea tulips) were harvested for food and traditional medicine.

== See also ==
- List of rivers of New Zealand
