= Plectonemertidae =

Scientific classification
- Kingdom: Animalia
- Phylum: Nemertea
- Class: Hoplonemertea
- Order: Monostilifera
- Suborder: Eumonostilifera
- Family: Plectonemertidae

Family of ribbon worms

Plectonemertidae is a family of worms belonging to the order Monostilifera.

Genera:

- Argonemertes Moore & Gibson, 1981
- Plectonemertes Gibson, 1990
- Potamonemertes Moore & Gibson, 1973
