= Buergeriellidae =

Scientific classification
- Domain: Eukaryota
- Kingdom: Animalia
- Phylum: Nemertea
- Class: Hoplonemertea
- Order: Polystilifera
- Suborder: Pelagica
- Family: Buergeriellidae

Family of ribbon worms

Buergeriellidae is a family of worms belonging to the order Polystilifera.

Genera:

- Buergeriella Brinkmann, 1917
