= Antiponemertes =

Scientific classification
- Domain: Eukaryota
- Kingdom: Animalia
- Phylum: Nemertea
- Class: Hoplonemertea
- Order: Monostilifera
- Family: Prosorhochmidae
- Genus: Antiponemertes; Moore & Gibson, 1981

Species
- A. allisonae; A. novaezealandiae; A. pantini

Genus of ribbon worms

Antiponemertes is a genus of nemertean worms that contains the following species:

- Antiponemertes allisonae (Moore, 1973)
- Antiponemertes novaezealandiae (Dendy, 1895)
- Antiponemertes pantini (Southgate, 1954)
