= Quasitetrastemma =

Scientific classification
- Kingdom: Animalia
- Phylum: Nemertea
- Class: Hoplonemertea
- Order: Monostilifera
- Suborder: Eumonostilifera
- Genus: Quasitetrastemma; Chernyshev, 2004

Genus of ribbon worms

Quasitetrastemma is a genus of worms belonging to the order Monostilifera, family unassigned.

The species of this genus are found in Northern Pacific Ocean.

Species:

- Quasitetrastemma bicolor Coe, 1901
- Quasitetrastemma nigrifrons (Coe, 1904)
- Quasitetrastemma stimpsoni Chernyshev, 1992
