= Nectonemertes =

Scientific classification
- Domain: Eukaryota
- Kingdom: Animalia
- Phylum: Nemertea
- Class: Hoplonemertea
- Order: Polystilifera
- Family: Nectonemertidae; Verrill, 1892
- Genus: Nectonemertes; Verrill, 1892

Genus of worms

Nectonemertes is a genus of worms belonging to the monotypic family Nectonemertidae.

The genus has almost cosmopolitan distribution.

Species:

- Nectonemertes acanthocephala Korotkevich, 1955
- Nectonemertes acutilobata Korotkevich, 1964
- Nectonemertes japonica Foshay, 1912
- Nectonemertes major Korotkevich, 1955
- Nectonemertes minima Brinkmann, 1915
- Nectonemertes mirabilis Verrill, 1892
- Nectonemertes primitiva Brinkmann, 1917
- Nectonemertes tenuis Korotkevich, 1964
