= Armaueriidae =

Scientific classification
- Domain: Eukaryota
- Kingdom: Animalia
- Phylum: Nemertea
- Class: Hoplonemertea
- Order: Polystilifera
- Suborder: Pelagica
- Family: Armaueriidae

Family of ribbon worms

Armaueriidae is a family of worms belonging to the order Polystilifera.

== Genera ==
Genera:

- Armaueria Brinkmann, 1917
- Mesarmaueria Korotkevich, 1955
- Neoarmaueria Chernyshev, 1992
- Proarmaueria Coe, 1926
- Proarmaueriella Chernyshev, 1992
- Proarmaueriella Tshernyshev, 1992
- Xenoarmaueria Chernyshev, 1992
- Xenoarmaueria Tshernyshev, 1992
- Zinarmaueria Chernyshev, 1992
- Zinarmaueria Tshernyshev, 1992
