= Dinonemertidae =

Scientific classification
- Domain: Eukaryota
- Kingdom: Animalia
- Phylum: Nemertea
- Class: Hoplonemertea
- Order: Polystilifera
- Suborder: Pelagica
- Family: Dinonemertidae; Brinkmann, 1917

Family of ribbon worms

Dinonemertidae is a family of worms belonging to the order Polystilifera.

Genera:

- Alexandronemertes Chernyshev, 1992
- Dinonemertes Laidlaw, 1906
- Paradinonemertes Brinkmann, 1915
- Planonemertes Coe, 1926
- Plionemertes Coe, 1926
- Tubonemertes Coe, 1954
