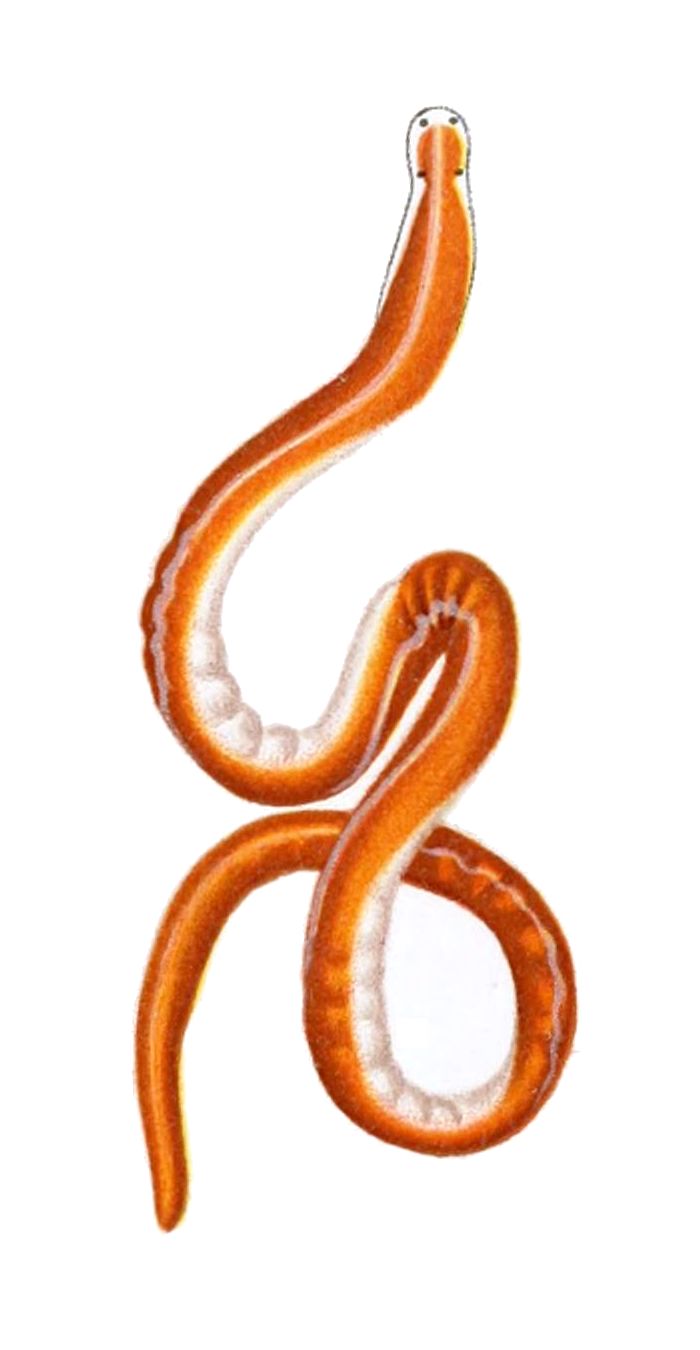
- Tetrastemma bicolor

Scientific classification
- Domain: Eukaryota
- Kingdom: Animalia
- Phylum: Nemertea
- Class: Hoplonemertea
- Order: Monostilifera
- Infraorder: Amphiporina
- Family: Tetrastemmatidae

= Tetrastemmatidae =

Family of ribbon worms

Tetrastemmatidae is a family of worms belonging to the order Monostilifera.

== Genera ==
Genera:

- Africanemertes Stiasny-Wijnhoff, 1942
- Albanemertes Senz, 1993
- Algonemertes Corrêa, 1954
- Ammonemertes Gibson, 1990
- Amphinemertes Coe, 1940
- Annulonemertes Berg, 1985
- Areonemertes Friedrich, 1933
- Asteronemertes Chernyshev, 1991
- Austroprostma Stiasny-Wijnhoff, 1942
- Coenemertes Corrêa, 1954
- Cyanophthalma Norenburg, 1986
- Dichonemertes Coe, 1938
- Digononemertes Gibson, 1990
- Divanella Gibson, 1974
- Itanemertes Corrêa, 1954
- Koinoporus Sánchez and Moretto, 1998
- Meionemertes Gibson, 1986
- Minutanemertes Senz, 1993
- Nareda Girard, 1854
- Nemertellina Friedrich, 1935
- Nemertellopsis Friedrich, 1935
- Paraminutanemertes Senz, 1993
- Paroerstediella Chernyshev, 1991
- Prostomatella Friedrich, 1935
- Prostomiopsis Friedrich, 1936
- Pseudocarcinonemertes Fleming & Gibson, 1981
- Quoyianemertes Senz, 2001
- Tetrastemma Ehrenberg, 1831
- Verillianemertes Senz, 2001
