= Drepanophorella =

Scientific classification
- Domain: Eukaryota
- Kingdom: Animalia
- Phylum: Nemertea
- Class: Hoplonemertea
- Order: Polystilifera
- Family: Drepanophorellidae
- Genus: Drepanophorella; Stiasny-Wijnhoff, 1936

Synonyms
- Drepanophoringia Stiasny-Wijnhoff, 1936

Genus of nemerteans

Drepanophorella is a genus of nemerteans belonging to the monotypic family Drepanophorellidae.

Species:

- Drepanophorella lifuensis Punnett, 1900
- Drepanophorella pajungae Stiasny-Wijnhoff, 1936
- Drepanophorella rosea Punnett, 1903
- Drepanophorella sebae Stiasny-Wijnhoff, 1936
- Drepanophorella tasmani Wheeler, 1940
- Drepanophorella waingapuensis Stiasny-Wijnhoff, 1936
