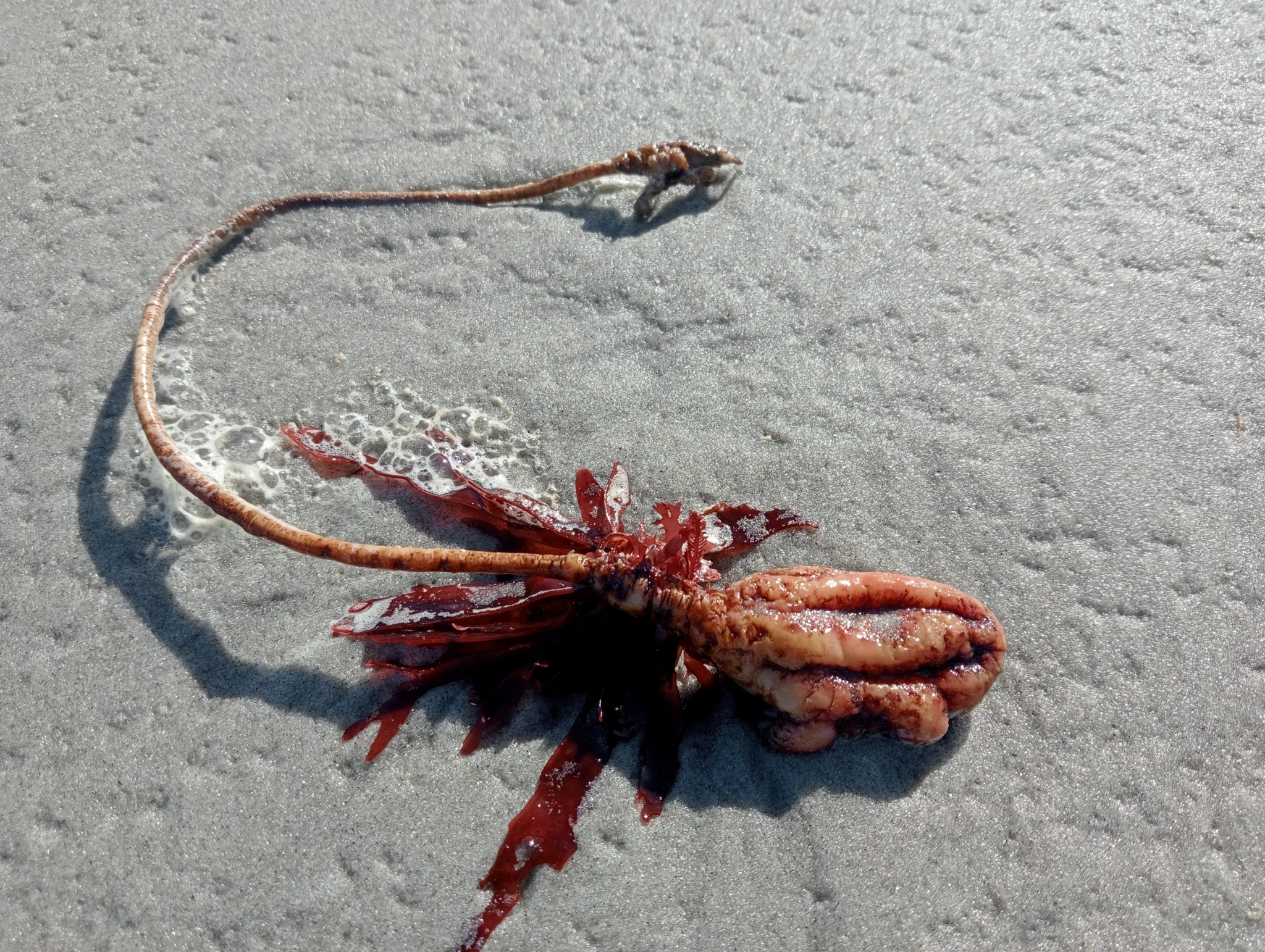
- Pyura pachydermatina washed up on a beach.

Scientific classification
- Domain: Eukaryota
- Kingdom: Animalia
- Phylum: Chordata
- Subphylum: Tunicata
- Class: Ascidiacea
- Order: Stolidobranchia
- Family: Pyuridae
- Genus: Pyura
- Species: P. pachydermatina

Binomial name
- Pyura pachydermatina (Herdman, 1881)

Synonyms
- Boltenia pachydermatina Herdman, 1881; Boltenia pedunculata Hutton, 1873; Pyura pachydermata (Herdman, 1881)

= Pyura pachydermatina =

Species of sea squirt

Pyura pachydermatina is a sea tulip, a solitary species of tunicate in the suborder Stolidobranchia. It is native to shallow waters around New Zealand.

== Description ==
Pyura pachydermatina has a club-shaped body supported by a long stalk, both being covered by a tough exterior tunic. In colour it is off-white or a garish shade of reddish-purple. The stalk is two thirds to three quarters the length of the whole animal which helps distinguish it from certain invasive tunicates not native to New Zealand such as Styela clava and Pyura stolonifera. It is one of the largest species of tunicates and can grow to over a metre (yard) in length.

== Distribution and habitat ==
Pyura pachydermatina is found attached to rocks in shallow, wave-swept areas of the seas around New Zealand. It is a filter feeder. It is usually found subtidally and prefers cooler waters than does Pyura stolonifera.

== Biology ==
Pyura pachydermatina has a lifespan of about one year. It breeds in the winter after which the adult generation die. The planktonic larvae settle on the seabed in late winter and early spring. It usually co-exists with a parasitic ribbon worm, Gononemertes australiensis which lives in its digestive gland or body cavity. This has a similar annual life cycle, the peak of which is synchronised with that of its host. The ribbon worm larvae invade their hosts when they are juveniles soon after settlement and become precociously mature within three weeks. This means that the maximum number of ribbon worm larvae are available to invade the hosts when they are newly settled. Almost all the tunicates contain at least one worm.

== Research ==
Cells lining the gut of Pyura pachydermatina have been found to contain an insulin-like material in two forms that are immunologically active.

The tissues of this tunicate are strengthened by the presence of two types of spicules. In the blood vessels in the tunic there are dogbone-shaped spicules and in the vessels in the body wall there are antler-shaped spicules. These spicules have a core of amorphous calcium carbonate enveloped in an insoluble layer of organic material with a thick exterior covering of calcite. This is in contrast to the spicules of a sponge such as Clathrina which has a calcite core, a thick layer of amorphous calcium carbonate and a thin outer covering of calcite.
