= Acteonemertidae =

Scientific classification
- Domain: Eukaryota
- Kingdom: Animalia
- Phylum: Nemertea
- Class: Hoplonemertea
- Order: Monostilifera
- Infraorder: Oerstediina
- Family: Acteonemertidae; Chernishev 2005

Family of ribbon worms

Acteonemertidae is a family of worms belonging to the order Monostilifera. It contains 5 genera which are terrestrial and can be found on the Iberian Peninsula.

Members of the family Acteonemertidae are a group of terrestrial and semi-terrestrial nemerteans. Nemerteans are ribbon worms with significant ecological diversity, with many species living on coastlines and fully terrestrial environments(Chernyshev, A. V. 2005). They are capable of surviving in harsh weather or water-scarce habitats by forming protective cocoons to prevent them from being dried out (Thollesson & Norenburg, 2003).

Genera:

- Acteonemertes Pantin, 1961
- Antiponemertes Moore & Gibson, 1981
- Argonemertes Moore & Gibson, 1981
- Katechonemertes Moore & Gibson, 1981
- Leptonemertes Girard, 1893
