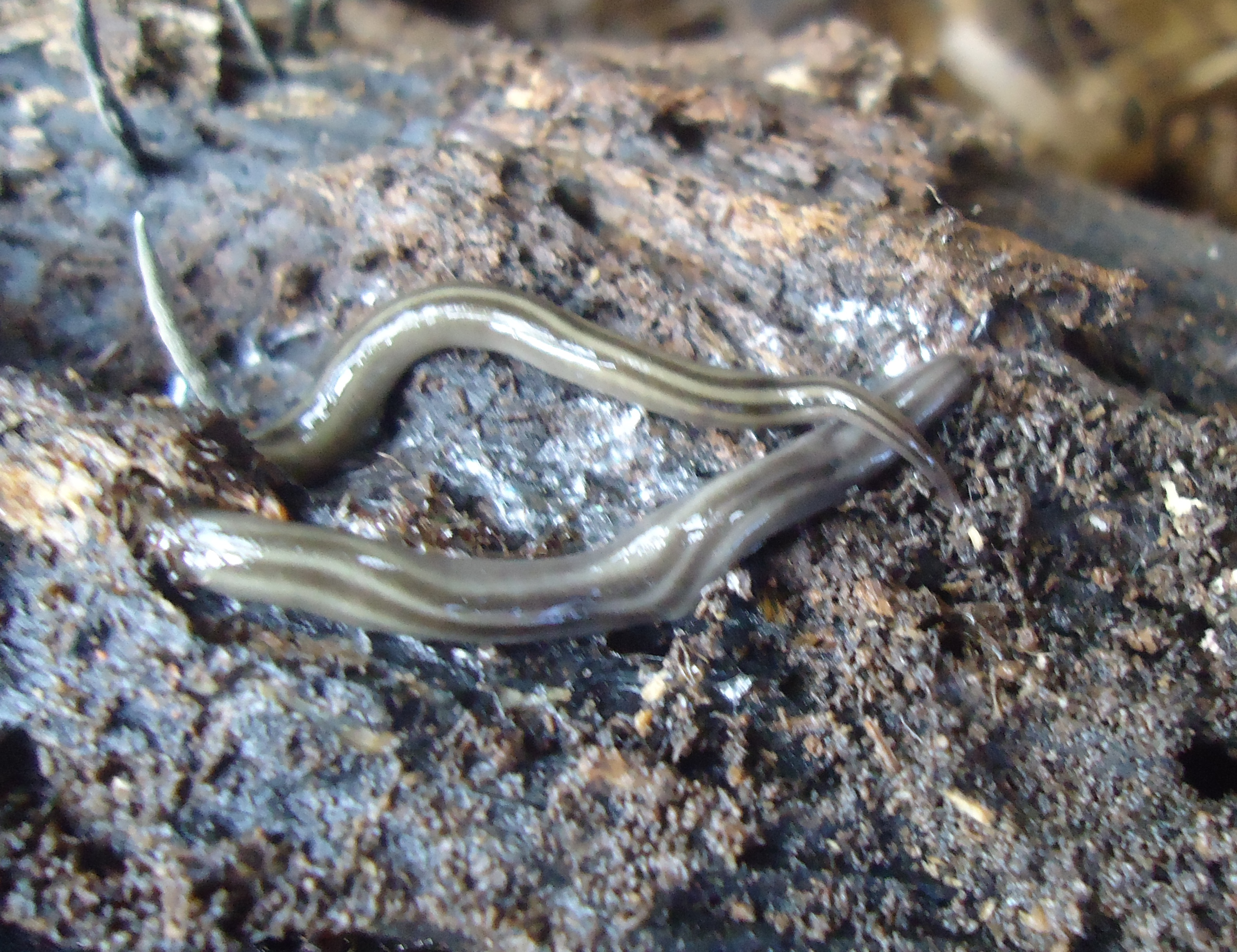
- Geonemertes sp., Mindanao

Scientific classification
- Kingdom: Animalia
- Phylum: Nemertea
- Class: Hoplonemertea
- Order: Monostilifera
- Suborder: Eumonostilifera
- Infraorder: Amphiporina
- Family: Prosorhochmidae

Genera
- Antiponemertes; Argonemertes; Geonemertes

= Prosorhochmidae =

Family of ribbon worms

Prosorhochmidae is a family of nemertean worms belonging to the suborder Monostilifera. It contains the following genera:

- Antiponemertes
- Arhochmus Maslakova & Norenburg, 2008
- Argonemertes
- Eonemertes Gibson, 1990
- Gononemertes Bergendal, 1900
- Geonemertes
- Prosadenoporus Bürger, 1890
- Prosorhochmus Keferstein, 1862
