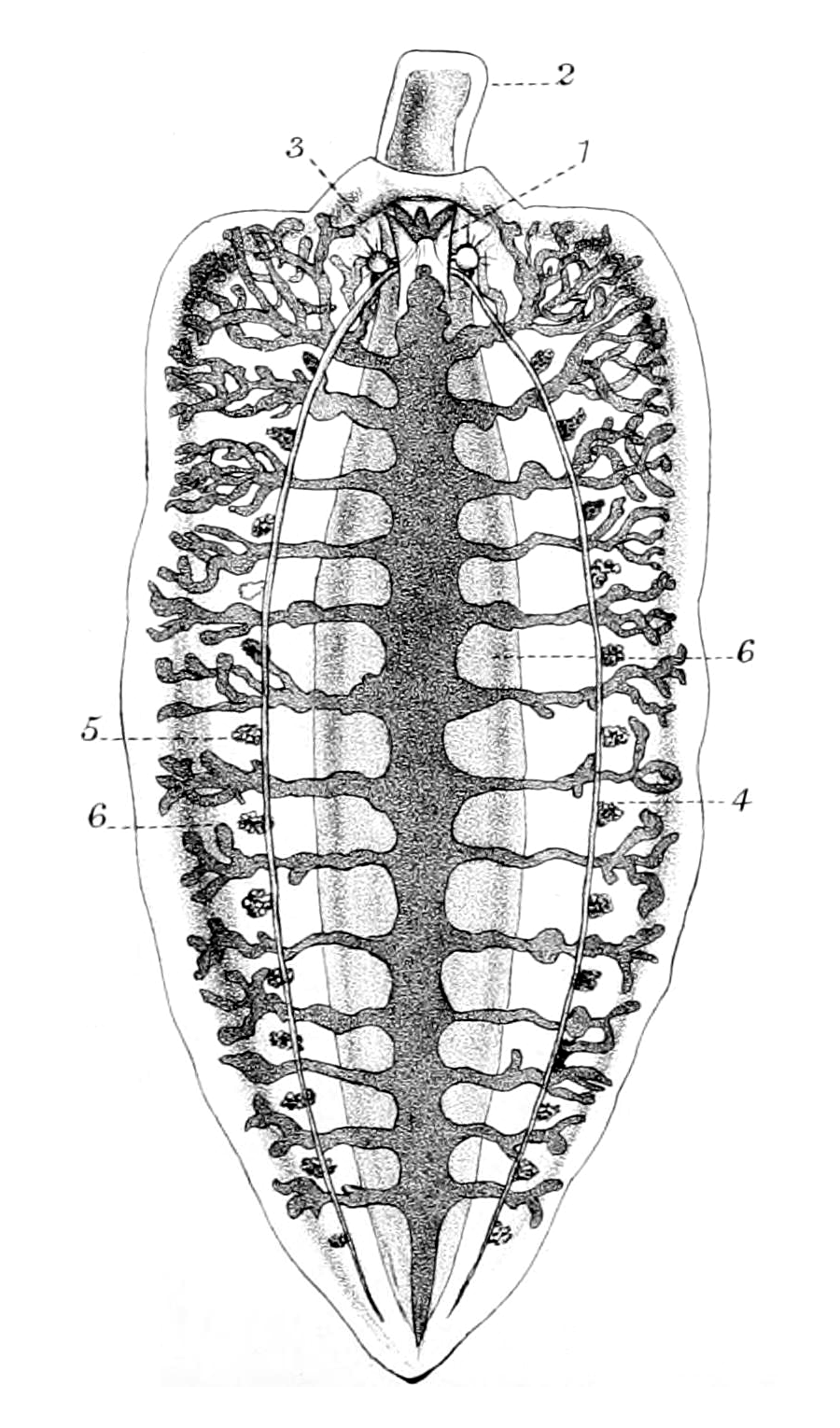
- Pelagonemertes rollestoni

Scientific classification
- Domain: Eukaryota
- Kingdom: Animalia
- Phylum: Nemertea
- Class: Hoplonemertea
- Order: Polystilifera

= Polystilifera =

Suborder of ribbon worms

Polystilifera is an suborder of worms belonging to the order Hoplonemertea.

Families:

- Armaueriidae
- Balaenanemertidae
- Brinkmanniidae
- Buergeriellidae
- Chuniellidae
- Dinonemertidae
- Drepanobandidae
- Drepanogigantidae
- Drepanophorellidae
- Drepanophoridae
- Drepanophoringiidae
- Nectonemertidae
- Pachynemertidae
- Paradrepanophoridae
- Pelagonemertidae
- Phallonemertidae
- Planktonemertidae
- Protopelagonemertidae
- Siboganemertidae
- Uniporidae
