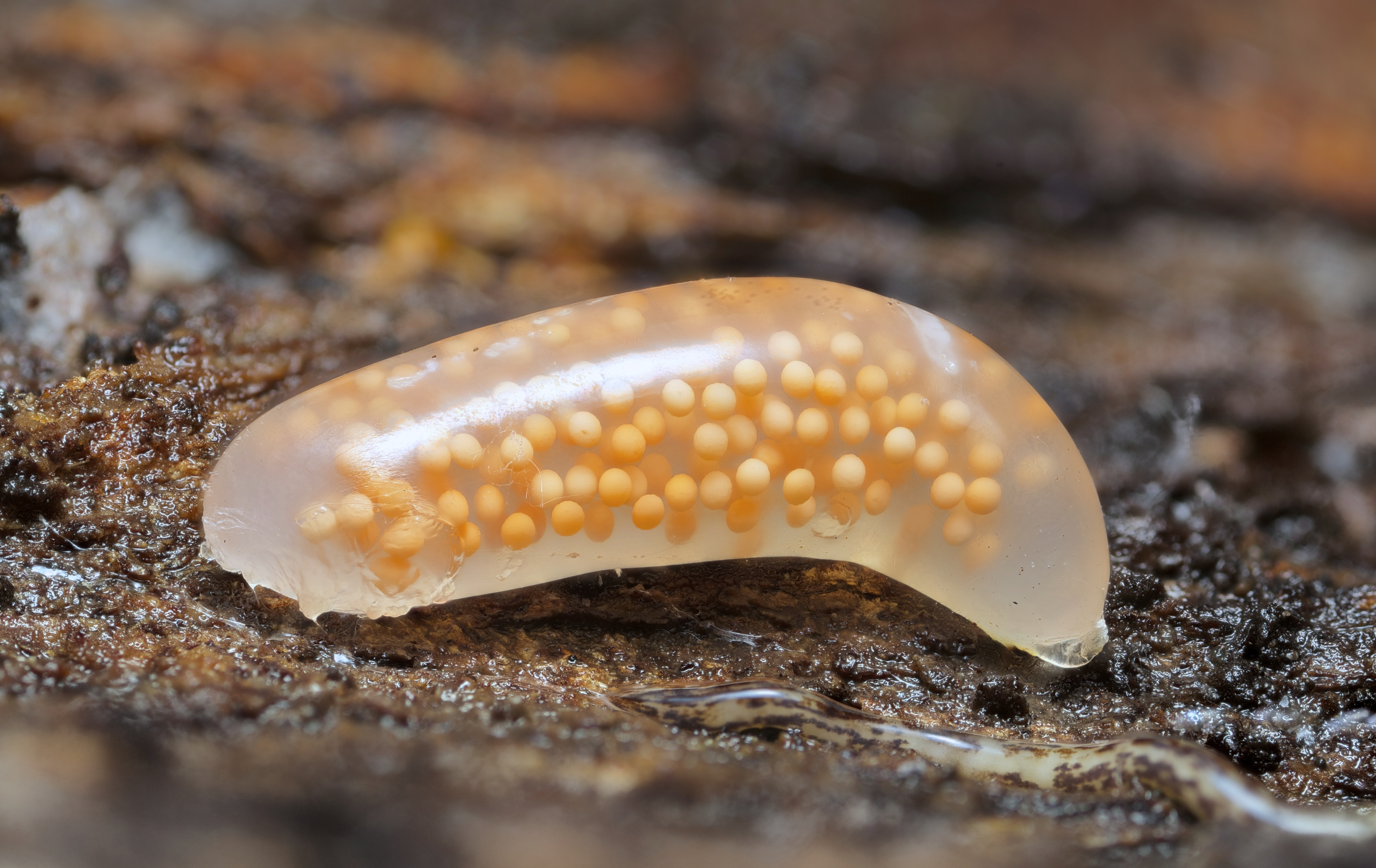
- Egg-case of Argonemertes australiensis

Scientific classification
- Kingdom: Animalia
- Phylum: Nemertea
- Class: Hoplonemertea
- Order: Monostilifera

Families
- See text

= Monostilifera =

Order of worms

Monostilifera is a suborder of nemertean worms belonging to the class Hoplonemertea (formerly Enopla), a class of worms characterized by the presence of a peculiar armature of spines or plates in their proboscis.

== Families ==
- Acteonemertidae
- Amphiporidae
- Carcinonemertidae
- Cratenemertidae
- Prosorhochmidae
- Tetrastemmatidae

Genus (unassigned family): Quasitetrastemma Chernyshev, 2004
