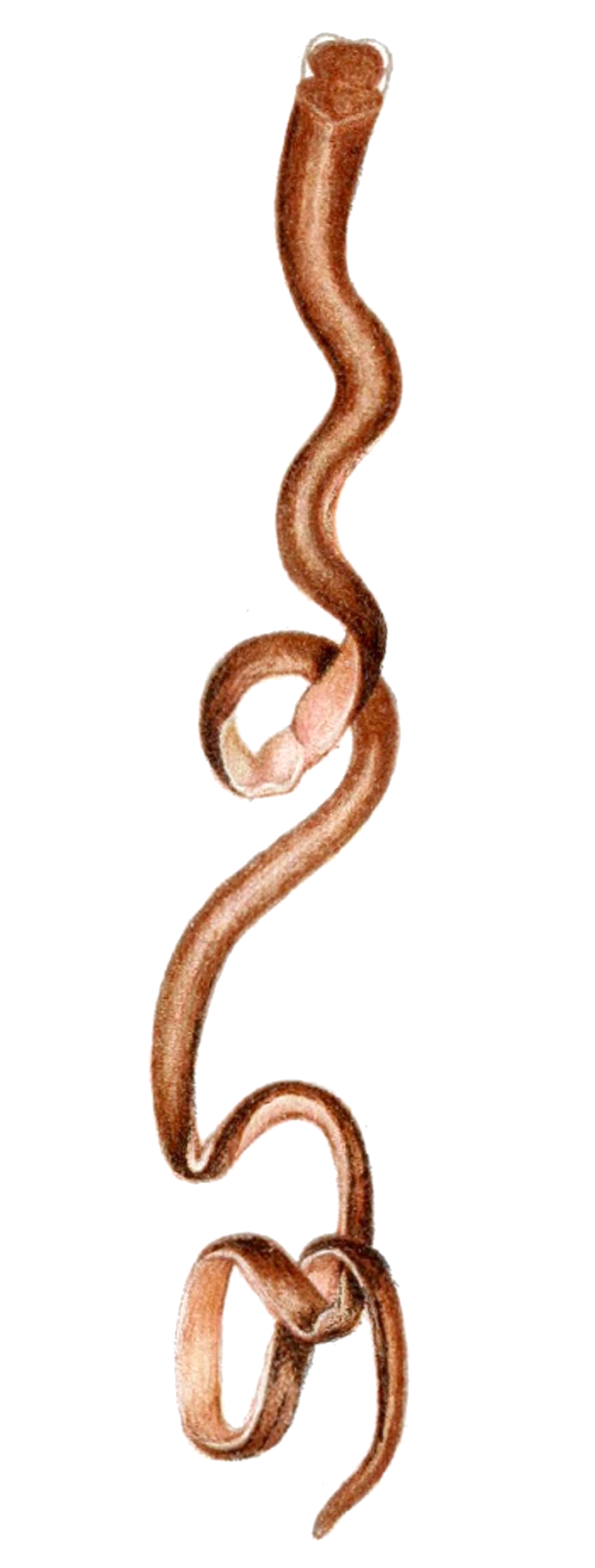
- Paranemertes peregrina

Scientific classification
- Domain: Eukaryota
- Kingdom: Animalia
- Phylum: Nemertea
- Superclass: Neonemertea
- Class: Hoplonemertea; Hubrecht, 1879

= Hoplonemertea =

Class of ribbon worms

Hoplonemertea is a class of ribbon worms. It contains two orders:

- Monostilifera
- Polystilifera

The proboscis is armed with one or more stylets; intestine straight, mostly with paired lateral diverticula; no posterior ventral sucker.
