= List of Nemertea of Ireland =

This is a list of the 44 species of Nemertea (ribbon worms, proboscis worms) found in Ireland.

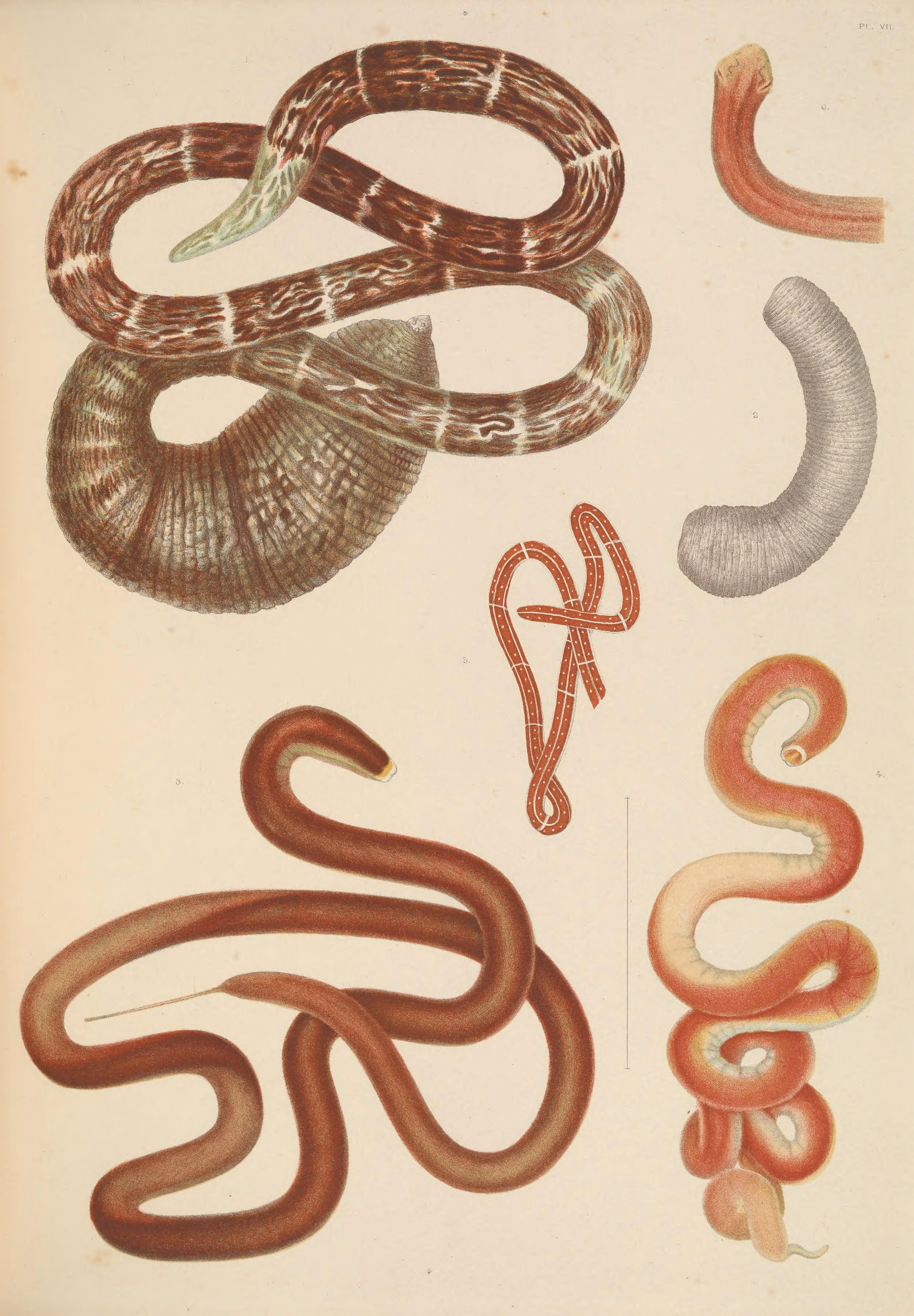
1, 2 Euborlasia elizabethae (Lineidae);3 Micrura purpurea (Lineidae); 4 Leucocephalonemertes aurantiaca (Lineidae);5 Carinella annulata (Tubulanidae);6 Emplectonema neesii (Örsted, 1843)

== Family Amphiporidae ==
- Amphiporus bioculatus McIntosh, 1874
- Amphiporus lactifloreus (Johnston, 1828)

== Family Cephalothricidae ==
- Cephalothrix rufifrons (Johnston, 1837)
- Cephalothrix filiformis Johnston, 1828

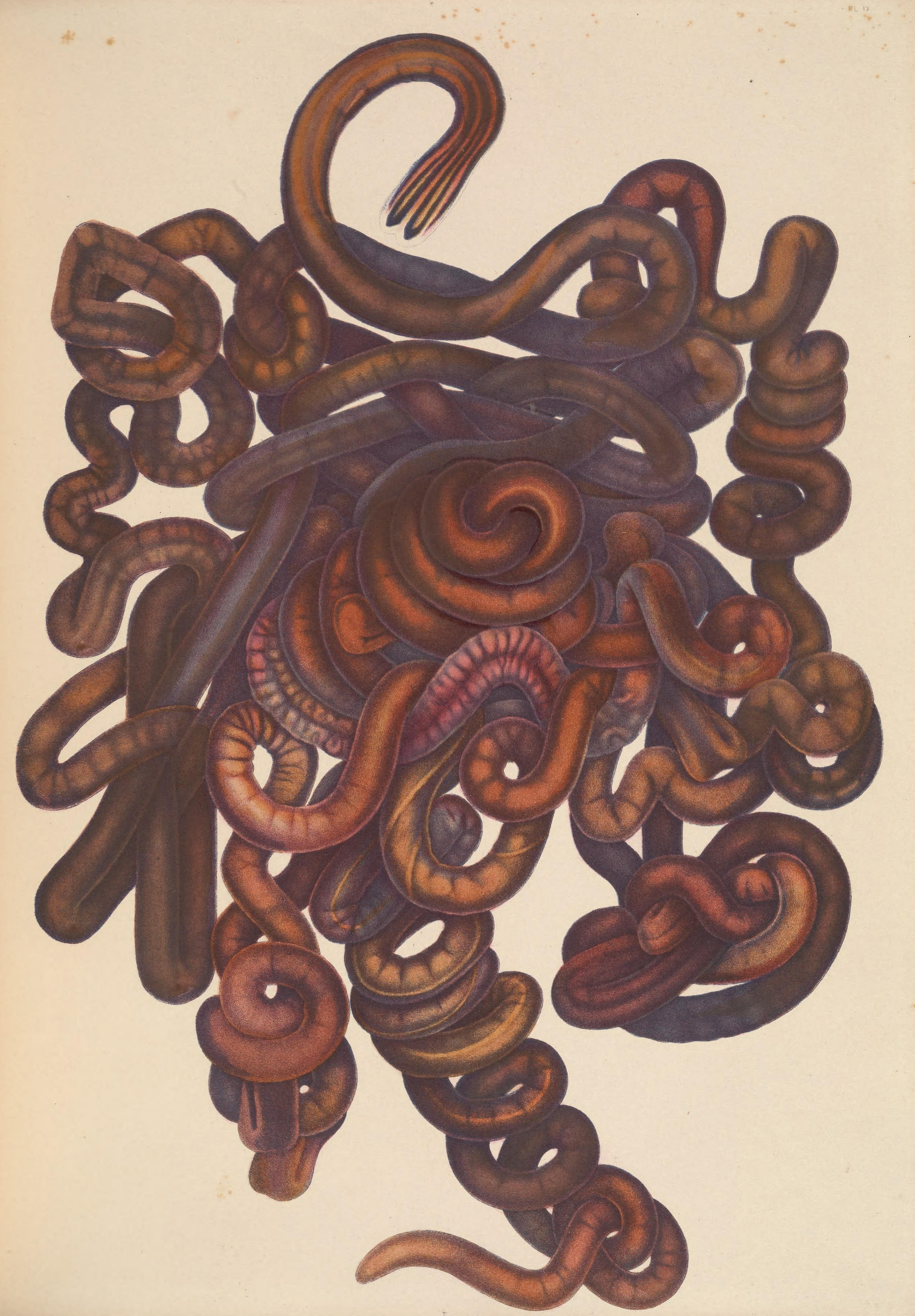
Lineus longissimus (Gunnerus, 1770)

== Family Lineidae ==
- Cerebratulus fuscus (McIntosh, 1874)
- Cerebratulus marginatus Renier, 1804
- Lineus acutifrons Southern, 1913
- Lineus longissimus (Gunnerus, 1770)
- Lineus ruber (Müller, 1774)
- Lineus viridis (Müller, 1774)
- Micrura fasciolata Ehrenberg, 1828
- Micrura purpurea (Dalyell, 1853)
- Ramphogordius lacteus Rathke, 1843

== Family Emplectonematidae ==
- Emplectonema gracile (Johnston, 1837)
- Nemertopsis flavida (McIntosh, 1873/74)

== Family Cratenemertidae ==
- Nipponnemertes pulchra (Johnston, 1837)

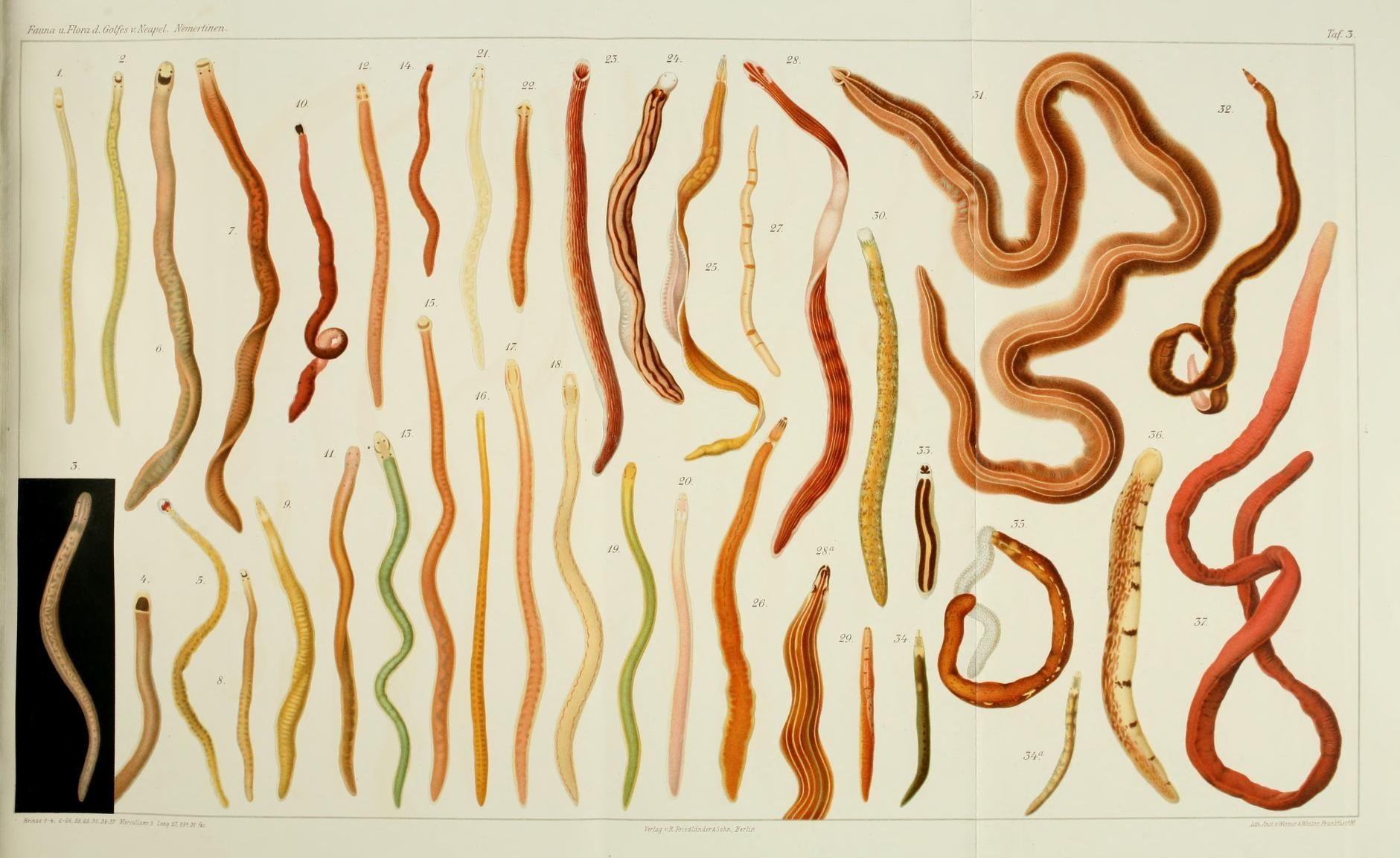
Tetrastemmatidae, Oerstediidae, Drepanophoridae

== Family Oerstediidae ==
- Oerstedia dorsalis (Abildgaard, 1806)

== Family Paradrepanophoridae ==
- Paradrepanophorus crassus (Quatrefages, 1846)

== Family Drepanophoridae ==
- Punnettia splendida (Keferstein, 1862)

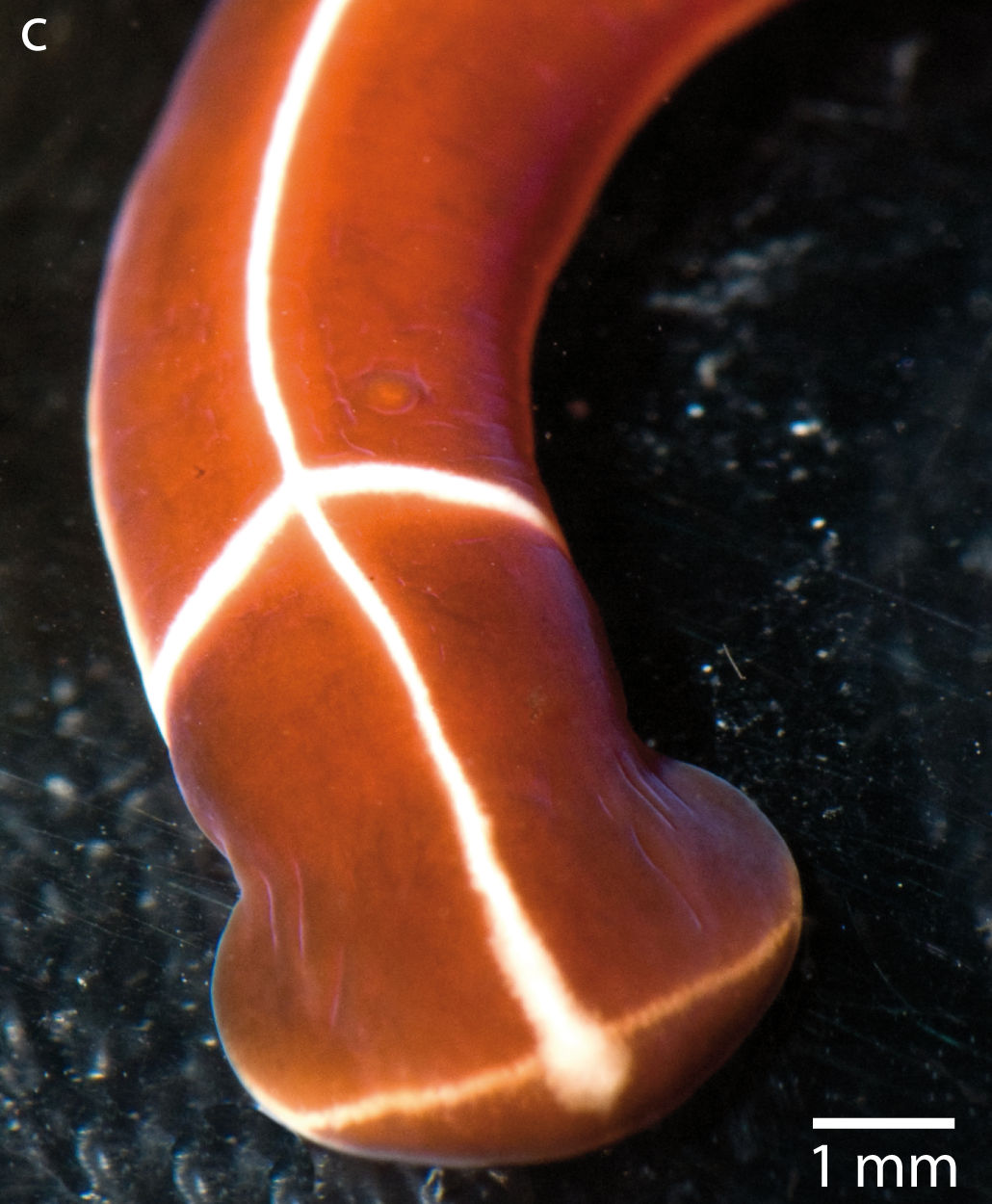
Tubulanus superbus

== Family Tetrastemmatidae ==
- Tetrastemma beaumonti (Southern, 1913)
- Tetrastemma candidum (Müller, 1774)
- Tetrastemma cephalophorum Bürger, 1895
- Tetrastemma coronatum (Quatrefages, 1846)
- Tetrastemma flavidum Ehrenberg, 1828
- Tetrastemma helvolum Bürger, 1895
- Tetrastemma melanocephalum (Johnston, 1837)
- Tetrastemma robertianae McIntosh, 1874
- Tetrastemma vermiculus (Quatrefages, 1846)

== Family Tubulanidae ==
- Tubulanus annulatus (Montagu, 1804)
- Tubulanus banyulensis (Joubin, 1890)
- Tubulanus inexpectatus (Hubrecht, 1880)
- Tubulanus linearis (McIntosh, 1874)
- Tubulanus superbus (Kölliker, 1845)
