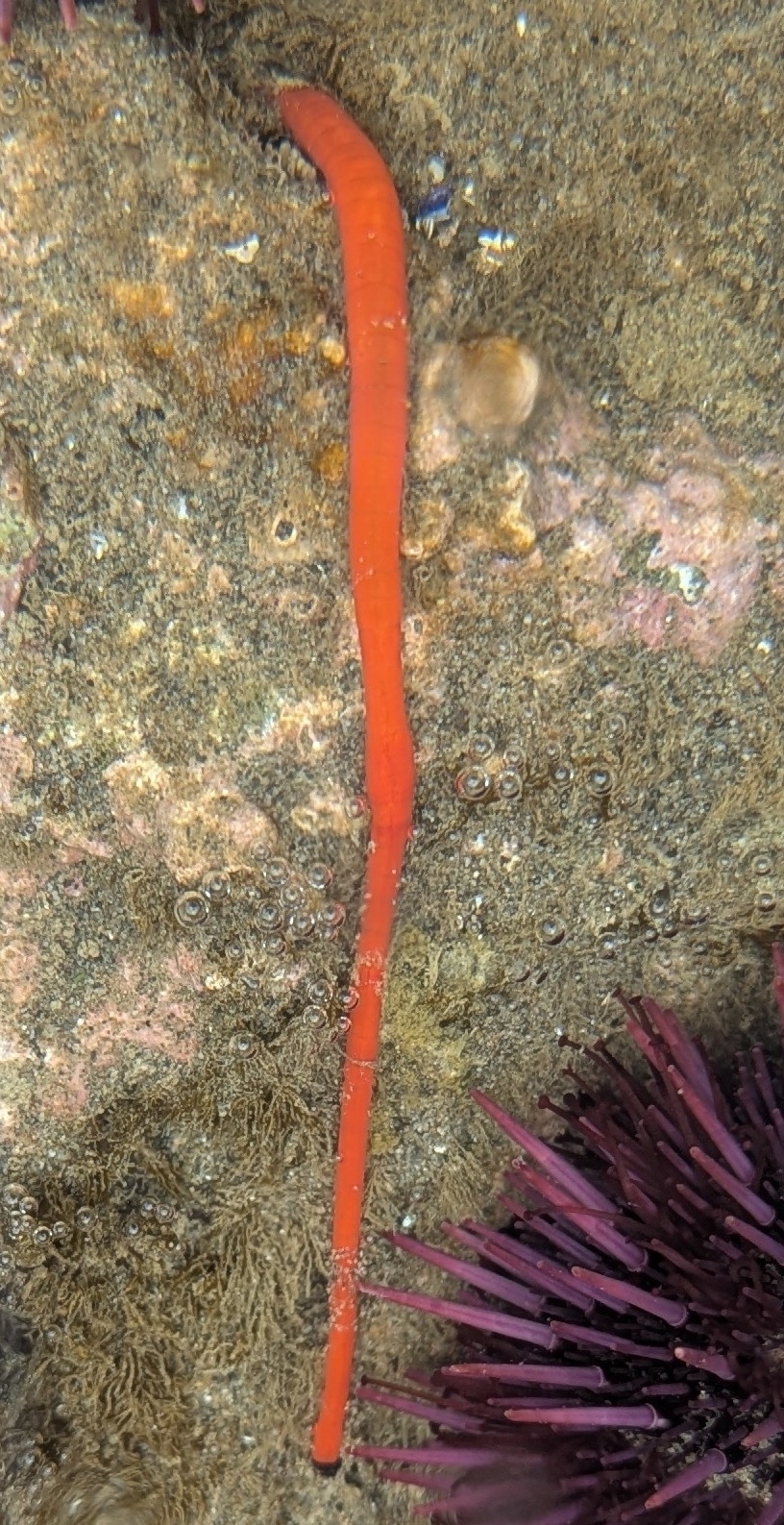
- Humboldt County, CA, 2025

Scientific classification
- Kingdom: Animalia
- Phylum: Nemertea
- Class: Palaeonemertea
- Order: Tubulaniformes
- Family: Tubulanidae
- Genus: Tubulanus
- Species: T. ruber

Binomial name
- Tubulanus ruber (Griffin, 1898)

Synonyms
- Carinella rubra Griffin, 1898

= Tubulanus ruber =

Species of ribbon worm

Tubulanus ruber is a species of ribbon worm in the phylum Nemertea. Its range extends across the Pacific coast of North America, from the Monterey Bay to the Gulf of Alaska. This species is found on boulders of the rocky intertidal, unlike many other species of Tubulanus that inhabit the sandy intertidal.

== Description ==
Tubulanus ruber can grow to more than 3 meters in length when fully extended, making this species one of the largest in its genus. It is also one of the visible, with its striking red, vermillion, or orange color.

== Taxonomy ==
Tubulanus ruber was first described by Bradney Beverley Griffin as Carinella rubra in 1898. This took place during his zoological expedition to Alaska and Washington as a graduate student, on fellowship from Columbia University. The species was later transferred to the genus Tubulanus. In 1940, Wesley Coe synonymized specimens from the Pacific Ocean with the type species, Tubulanus polymorphus, which was known from the Atlantic Ocean. However, a 2015 study re-established T. ruber as a separate species, citing distinct differences in coloration, reproductive biology, habitat, and genetics.
