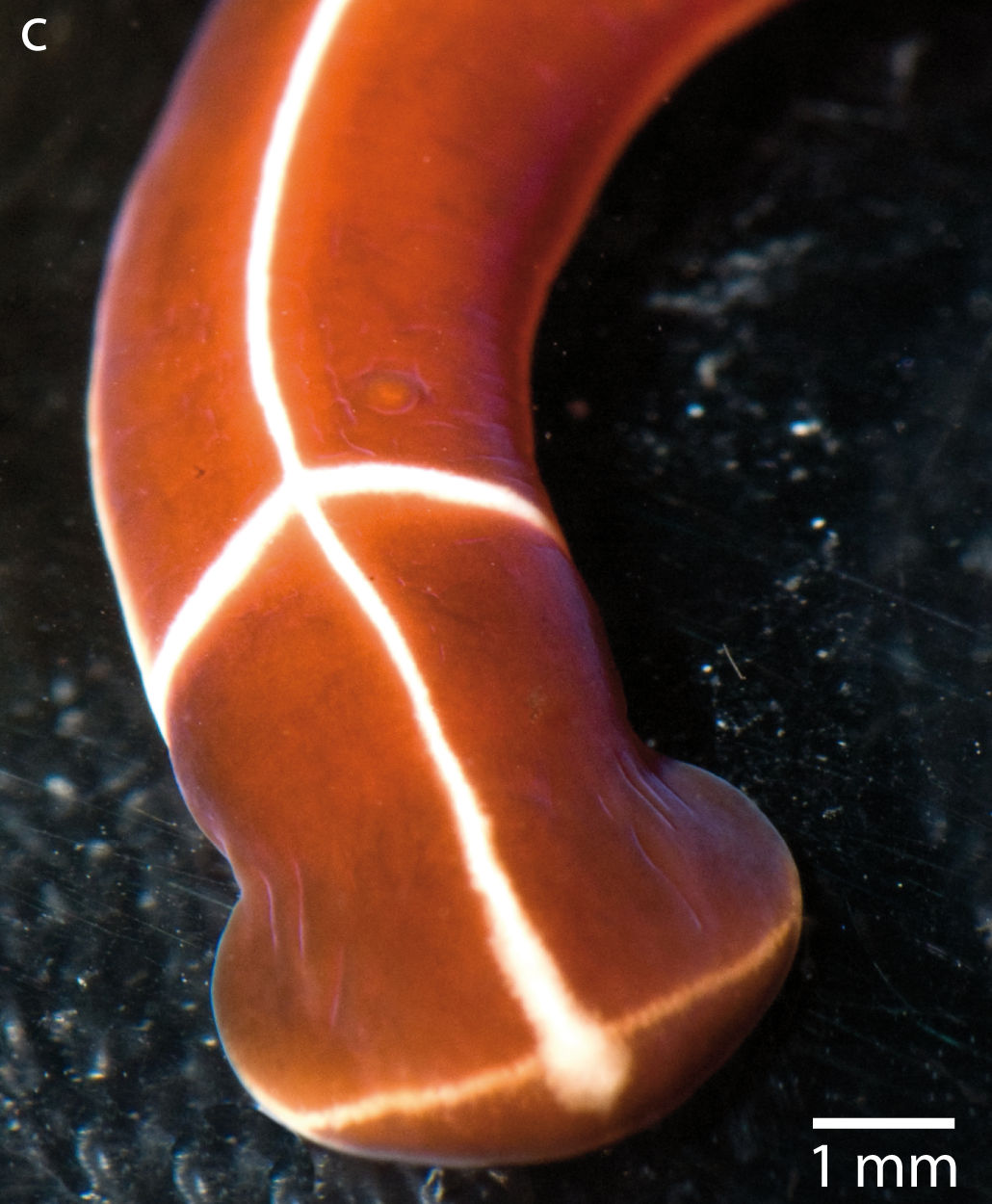
- Head

Scientific classification
- Domain: Eukaryota
- Kingdom: Animalia
- Phylum: Nemertea
- Class: Palaeonemertea
- Order: Tubulaniformes
- Family: Tubulanidae
- Genus: Tubulanus
- Species: T. superbus

Binomial name
- Tubulanus superbus (Kölliker, 1845)

Synonyms
- Gordius anguis; Nemertes supera; Nemertes superba; Nemertes superbus Kölliker, 1845; Tubulans superba; Valencinia ornata

= Tubulanus superbus =

Species of ribbon worm

Tubulanus superbus, commonly known as the football jersey worm, is a species of ribbon worm in the phylum Nemertea. Found in the northern Atlantic Ocean, the North Sea and the Mediterranean Sea, it occurs from the lower shore down to about 80 m (260 ft), on sand or gravel.

== Description ==
Tubulanus superbus grows to a length of 75 cm (30 in) or more but is only about 5 mm (0.2 in) wide. It has a rounded head and a firm, cylindrical body, gradually decreasing in diameter to a bluntly pointed tail. The colouring is distinctive, being bright red, reddish-brown or dark brown with white or yellowish lines along the mid-dorsal, lateral and mid-ventral surfaces, and white rings girdling the body; the front three rings are widely spaced while the hinder ones are more closely packed together. There are a pair of sensory organs on the sides of the worm near the front of the body, but no cephalic glands (mucus secreting glands) on the head in this species. This worm is similar in appearance to Tubulanus annulatus, but that species lacks the white line along the ventral surface. Tubulanus superbus is often surrounded by a mucoid sheath to which sand and other fragments adhere.

== Distribution and habitat ==
This species is native to the northeastern Atlantic Ocean, where its range extends from Greenland and Scandinavia southwards to the British Isles, the Atlantic coast of France and the Mediterranean Sea. Although sometimes found intertidally, it is more commonly found in soft sediments such as sand and gravel dredged up from the seabed, where it lives at depths of 80 m (260 ft) or more.

== Ecology ==
A predator, scavenger and omnivore, T. superbus glides by cilliary action over the seabed on a trail of slime. On encountering prey, the proboscis is everted (turned inside out) through a pore near the snout. The proboscis winds around the prey and mucus and toxic secretions immobilise it. It is then passed to the mouth and swallowed whole, or if too large, digestive juices are secreted onto it and the semi-digested tissues are sucked into the mouth.
