= Carinina =

Scientific classification
- Domain: Eukaryota
- Kingdom: Animalia
- Phylum: Nemertea
- Class: Palaeonemertea
- Order: Tubulaniformes
- Family: Tubulanidae
- Genus: Carinina; Hubrecht, 1885

Genus of ribbon worms

Carinina is a genus of nemerteans belonging to the family Tubulanidae.

The species of this genus are found in Europe and Northern America.

Species:

- Carinina antarctica Bürger, 1904
- Carinina arenaria Hylbom, 1957
- Carinina atavia (Bergendal, 1902)
