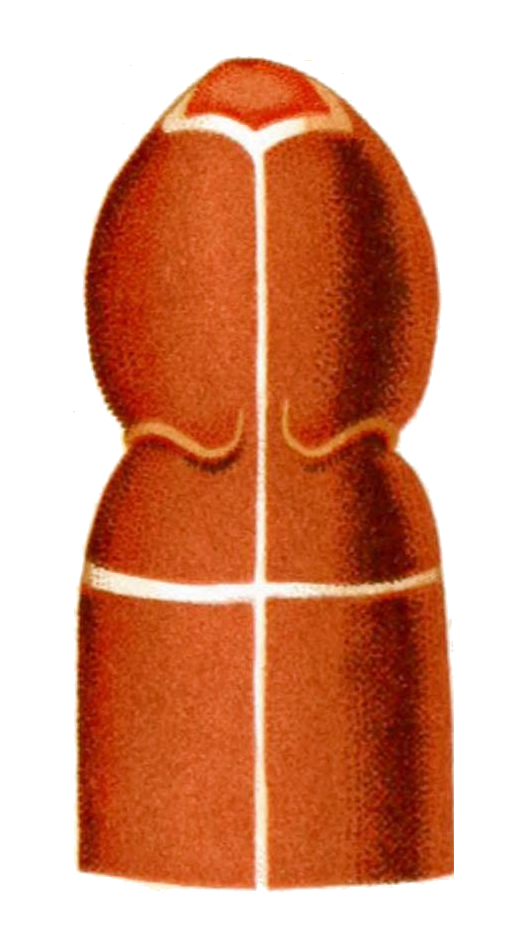
- Head

Scientific classification
- Domain: Eukaryota
- Kingdom: Animalia
- Phylum: Nemertea
- Class: Palaeonemertea
- Order: Tubulaniformes
- Family: Tubulanidae
- Genus: Tubulanus
- Species: T. annulatus

Binomial name
- Tubulanus annulatus (Montagu, 1804)

Synonyms
- Carinella aragoi; Carinella macintoshi; Carinella mcintoshii; Carinella trilineata; Gordius annulatus Montagu, 1804; Lineus annulatus; Meckelia trilineata; Polia crucigera

= Tubulanus annulatus =

Species of ribbon worm

Tubulanus annulatus, commonly known as the football jersey worm, is a species of ribbon worm in the phylum Nemertea. It ranges across the northern Atlantic Ocean, the North Sea and the Mediterranean Sea, being present from the lower shore down to about 40 m (130 ft), on sand, gravel and other habitats.

== Taxonomy ==
This species was first described in 1804 by the zoologist and ornithologist George Montagu as Gordius annulatus but was later transferred to the newly created genus Tubulanus.

== Description ==
Tubulanus annulatus is an elongated, slender worm that can reach 75 cm (30 in) in length but does not usually exceed 4 mm (0.16 in) in width except when fully contracted. The dorsal surface is a bright red, orange-red or brownish-red in colour, with three longitudinal white lines and up to fifty white transverse rings, while the underside is paler. The dorsal white line runs from the white snout region while the two lateral white lines start at the first transverse ring. There is no ventral white line as is the case in the otherwise similar Tubulanus superbus. The first transverse rings are far apart from each other while the remaining rings are closer together and approximately equidistant. This species does not have lateral sensory glands on its flanks, but there are cephalic glands (mucus-producing glands) on the head. It often secretes a silken mucous tube to which sand grains and other particles stick. It is possible that the distinctive colouring of this species is aposometic, warning fish or other predators that the worm is unpalatable.

== Distribution and habitat ==
The range includes the northwestern Atlantic Ocean, the North Sea and the Mediterranean Sea as well as both Atlantic and Pacific coasts of North America. Although sometimes found on the lower shore, it is more common in the subtidal zone to depths of about 40 m (130 ft) or more. It is found in a range of habitats including sand, gravel, silt and mud, as well as among shellfish.

== Ecology ==
As an omnivore, T. annulatus functions as both a predator and scavenger. It glides over the seabed on a trail of slime produced by the cephalic glands. On encountering prey, the proboscis is everted (turned inside out) through a pore near the snout. The proboscis winds around the prey and mucus and toxic secretions immobilise it. It is then passed to the mouth and swallowed whole, or if too large, digestive juices are secreted onto it and the semi-digested tissues are sucked into the mouth.
