= Callinera =

Scientific classification
- Kingdom: Animalia
- Phylum: Nemertea
- Class: Palaeonemertea
- Order: Tubulaniformes
- Family: Callineridae
- Genus: Callinera; Bergendal, 1900

Genus of worms

Callinera is a genus of worms belonging to the family Callineridae.

The species of this genus are found in Europe.

Species:

- Callinera bergendali Gibson & Sundberg, 1999
- Callinera blanchardi Senz, 2000
- Callinera buergeri Bergendal, 1900
- Callinera emiliae Kajihara, 2007
- Callinera grandis Bergendal, 1903
- Callinera monensis Rogers, Gibson & Thorpe, 1992
- Callinera nishikawai Kajihara, 2006
- Callinera quatrefagesi Senz, 2000
- Callinera zhirmunskyi Chernyshev, 2002
