= Carinella =

Carinella may refer to:

- Carinella, a genus of worms in the family Tubulanidae, synonym of Tubulanus
- Carinella, a genus of gastropods in the family Amastridae, synonym of Kauaia
- Carinella, a genus of nematodes in the family Onchocercidae, synonym of Aproctella
- Carinella, a fossil genus of bivalves in the order Hippuritida, family unassigned, synonym of Caprinella
- Carinella, a fossil genus of bryozoans in the family Goniocladiidae, synonym of Goniocladia
