= Carinoma =

Scientific classification
- Kingdom: Animalia
- Phylum: Nemertea
- Class: Palaeonemertea
- Family: Carinomidae
- Genus: Carinoma; Oudemans, 1885

Genus of worms

Carinoma is a genus of worms belonging to the family Carinomidae.

The genus has almost cosmopolitan distribution.

Species:

- Carinoma armandi (McIntosh, 1875)
- Carinoma caraibica Stiasny-Wijnhoff, 1925
- Carinoma coei
- Carinoma hamanako Kajihara, Yamasaki & Andrade, 2011
- Carinoma mutabilis Griffin, 1898
- Carinoma patagonica Bürger, 1895
- Carinoma patriciae Gibson, 1979
- Carinoma renieri Senz, 2000
- Carinoma sachalinica (Korotkevich, 1982)
- Carinoma tremaphoros Thompson, 1900
- Carinoma uschakovi Chernyshev, 1999
