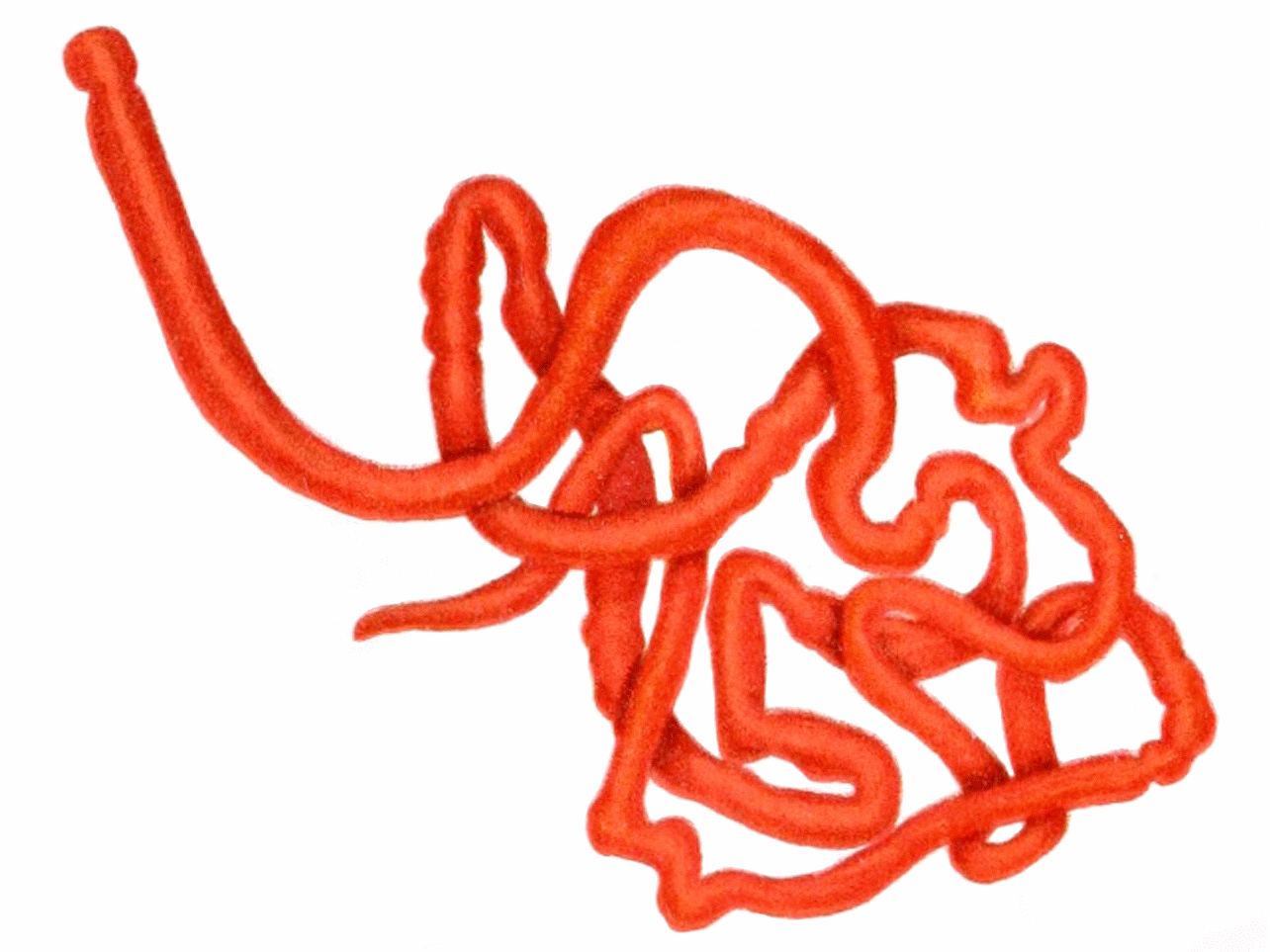

Scientific classification
- Kingdom: Animalia
- Phylum: Nemertea
- Class: Palaeonemertea
- Order: Tubulaniformes
- Family: Tubulanidae
- Genus: Tubulanus
- Species: T. polymorphus

Binomial name
- Tubulanus polymorphus Renier, 1804

Synonyms
- Carinella polymorpha; Carinella speciosa; Nemertes elegans; Nemertes polymorpha; Ophyocephalus polymorphus; Valencia splendida; Valencinia splendida

= Tubulanus polymorphus =

Species of ribbon worm

Tubulanus polymorphus is a species of ribbon worm in the phylum Nemertea. It is found in the northern Atlantic Ocean and the northern Pacific Ocean. It occurs on the lower shore down to about 50 m (160 ft), on sand or gravel, under stones and among seaweed.

== Description ==
Like other ribbon worms, T. polymorphus is not divided into segments but is soft, smooth and contractile. It is up to 50 cm (20 in) long but just 5 mm (0.2 in) wide, with a rounded head slightly broader than the body. There is a proboscis pore and a mouth on the underside of the head but there are no eye-spots or cephalic slits. Fresh specimens are a dark reddish-brown or orangeish-brown. Specimens preserved in alcohol lose their colour but exhibit a transverse dark band. This has a clear cut anterior margin but a posterior margin that fades gradually. A pair of sensory organs is located at the sides near the posterior margin of this band. This worm can be distinguished from other similar species by the absence of whitish bands or stripes on the body or white patches on the head, as well as by certain muscle fibres crossing over muscle layers in the dorsal part of the body wall, but not in the ventral part.

== Distribution and habitat ==
The species occurs in water at depths down to about 50 m (160 ft) in both the northern Atlantic Ocean, the Mediterranean Sea and the northeastern Pacific Ocean. It is typically present on sand or gravel substrates, often under stones or among seaweeds or mussels.

== Ecology ==
Tubulanus polymorphus is a carnivore. On encountering a worm, crustacean or other prey item, the proboscis is everted (turned inside out) through the proboscis pore. The proboscis winds around the prey and mucus and toxic secretions immobilise it. It is then passed to the mouth and swallowed whole, or if too large, digestive juices are secreted onto it and the semi-digested tissues are sucked into the mouth. The sexes are separate in this species. The females lay eggs which are fertilised externally and develop directly into juvenile worms.

This ribbon worm is diurnal and makes little attempt to avoid predation. It is possible that its bright red colouration is aposemetic, giving warning that this particular ribbon worm is toxic or unpalatable. An alternative theory is that the colour may make the worm less visible to fish, which have colour vision, because the red wavelength light gets absorbed by the water and thus the worm appears dark.
