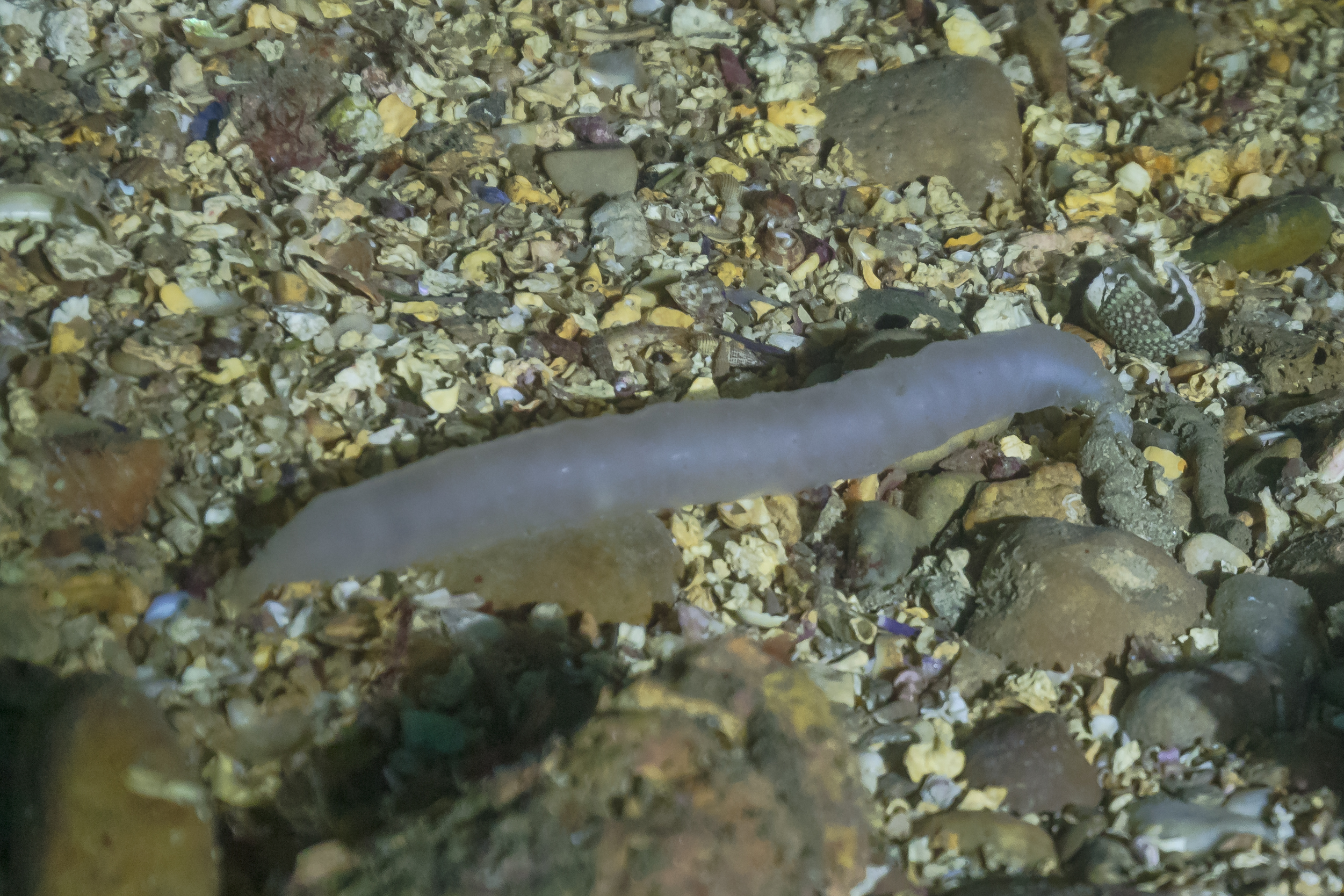

Scientific classification
- Domain: Eukaryota
- Kingdom: Animalia
- Phylum: Nemertea
- Class: Hoplonemertea
- Order: Monostilifera
- Family: Amphiporidae
- Genus: Amphiporus
- Species: A. lactifloreus

Binomial name
- Amphiporus lactifloreus (Johnston, 1828)

Synonyms
- Amphiporus lacteiflorus; Amphiporus laetifloreus; Amphiporus loetofloreus; Borlasia alba; Borlasia mandilla; Ditactorrhochma mandilla; Gordius albicans; Nemertes lactiflorea; Nemertes mandilla; Planaria lactiflorea

= Amphiporus lactifloreus =

Species of ribbon worm

Amphiporus lactifloreus is a species of ribbon worm in the phylum Nemertea. It is found on the lower shore, under stones, in shingle and amongst the fronds of seaweed.

== Distribution ==
This worm is found round the coasts of north west Europe, the Mediterranean Sea, the Gulf of Maine and Cobscook Bay. It is common round the coasts of Britain and Ireland.

== Description ==
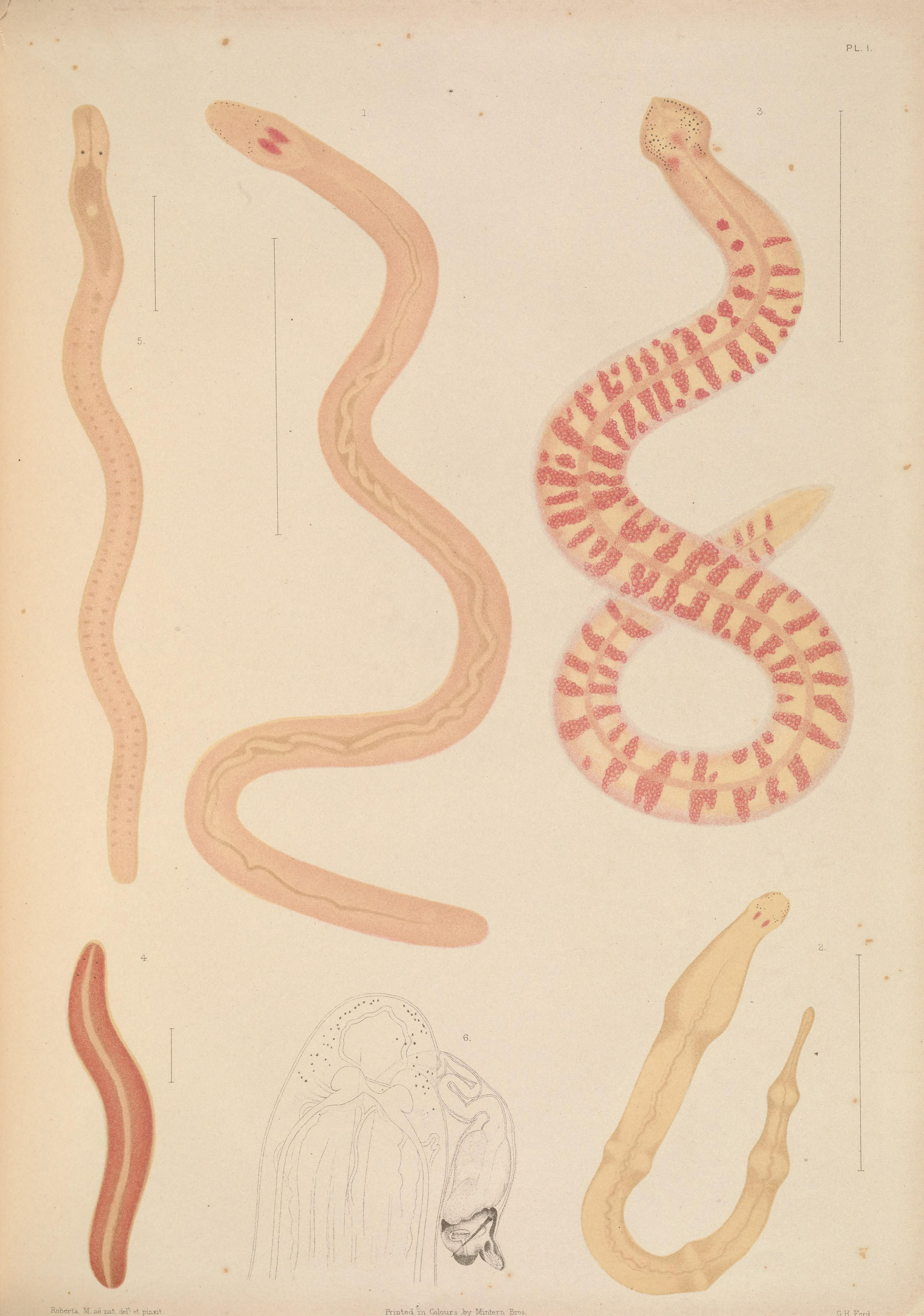
Amphiporus lactifloreus figures 1, 2

Like other ribbon worms, A. lactifloreus is not divided into segments but is smooth and contractile. It is up to eight centimetres long with a head slightly broader than the body. The eyes are in four groups, two rows on either side of the front of the head and two more central clusters further back. There is a proboscis which can be extended forward from an opening above the mouth and which can be as long as the body and it is armed with a needle-like stylet. The neck is slightly constricted. The body is rounded above and flattened below and has a flattened tail with a rounded end. The general colour is whitish or pale pink and translucent. There are two small deeper pink patches at the back of the head. The gut can be seen as a thread-like, dark coloured, irregular line down the centre of the body.

== Habitat ==
This worm is locally abundant on fairly clean sandy or gravelly sediments from just below the zone where Pelvetia canaliculata grows down to depths of 250 metres. It is also found amongst shell debris, on Laminaria, Fucus and Ascophyllum and, less commonly, in silty or muddy areas. It is fairly tolerant of fluctuating salinity.

== Biology ==
Movement is performed by small waves of muscular contraction that flow along the body from tail to head. Several waves may occur simultaneously and the worm glides forward slowly and smoothly, the swellings running evenly along the body. It is carnivorous, either sucking the body juices of its prey or swallowing the whole animal. It feeds on protozoans, other small creatures and prey of a size up to its own.

The sexes are distinct and fertilisation is external. Asexual reproduction also occurs by fragmentation. When handled, this worm easily breaks into pieces.
