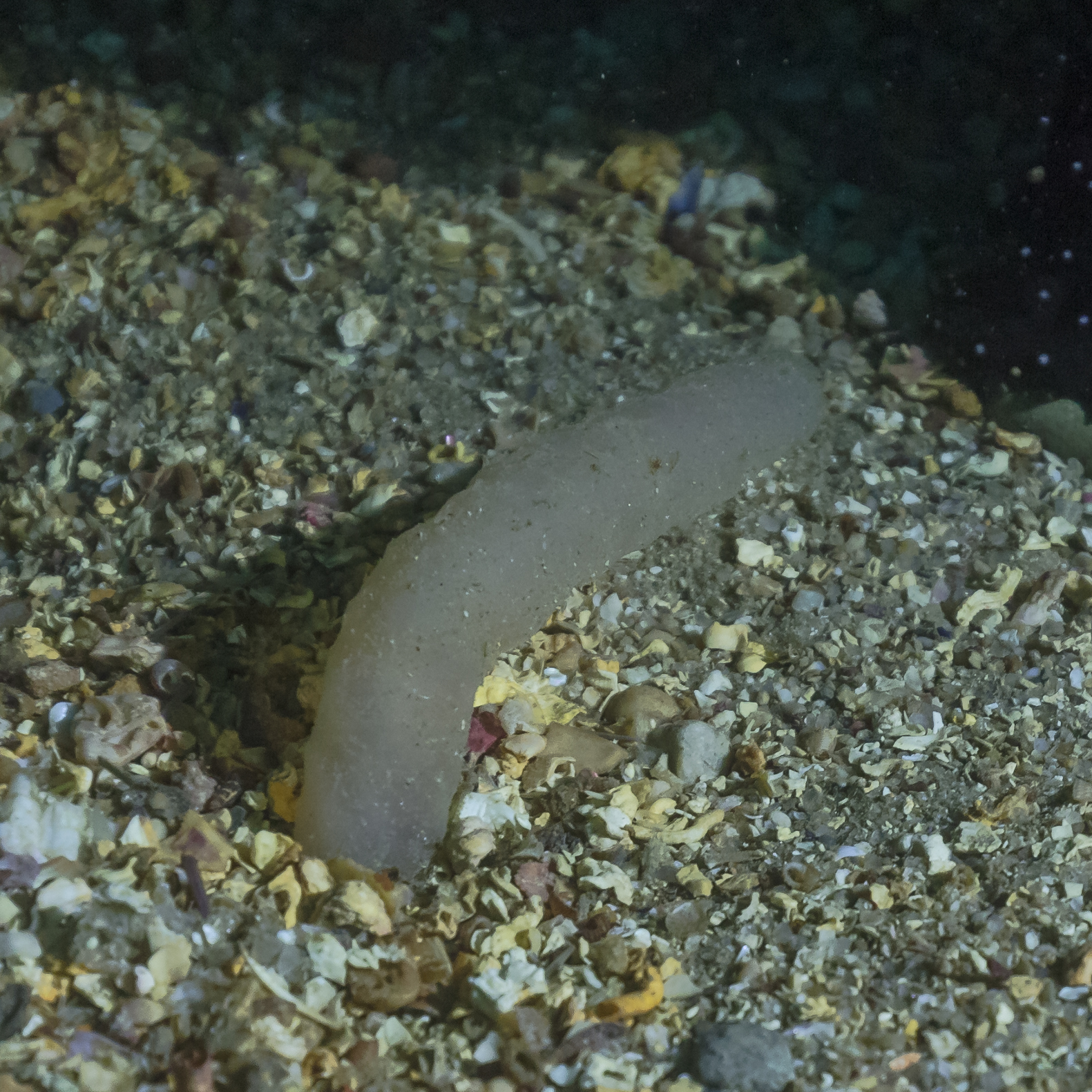
- Amphiporus lactifloreus

Scientific classification
- Kingdom: Animalia
- Phylum: Nemertea
- Class: Hoplonemertea
- Order: Monostilifera
- Family: Amphiporidae
- Genus: Amphiporus; Ehrenberg, 1831

= Amphiporus =

Genus of ribbon worms

Amphiporus is a genus of nemerteans belonging to the family Amphiporidae.

The genus has cosmopolitan distribution.

== Species ==
Species:

- Amphiporus allucens Bürger, 1895
- Amphiporus angulatus (Müller, 1774)
- Amphiporus antifuscus Iwata, 1954
- Amphiporus binocellatus Senz, 1993
- Amphiporus brunneus Griffin, 1898
- Amphiporus californicus Coe, 1905
- Amphiporus cruciatus Bürger, 1893
- Amphiporus cruentatus Verrill, 1879
- Amphiporus delta Joubin, 1902
- Amphiporus dissimulans Riches, 1893
- Amphiporus exilis Coe, 1901
- Amphiporus flavescens Coe, 1905
- Amphiporus formidabilis Griffin, 1898
- Amphiporus fulvus Coe, 1905
- Amphiporus fuscosparus Korotkevich, 1977
- Amphiporus gelatinosus Coe, 1905
- Amphiporus gerlachei Bürger, 1904
- Amphiporus glandulosus Bürger, 1895
- Amphiporus greenmani Montgomery, 1897
- Amphiporus griseus (Stimpson, 1855)
- Amphiporus heteromusculosus (Chernyshev, 1998)
- Amphiporus heterosorus Verrill, 1892
- Amphiporus imparispinosus Griffin, 1898
- Amphiporus incubator Joubin, 1914
- Amphiporus inexpectatus Wheeler, 1934
- Amphiporus japonicus (Stimpson, 1857)
- Amphiporus lactifloreus (Johnston, 1828)
- Amphiporus lecointei Bürger, 1904
- Amphiporus leptacanthus Coe, 1905
- Amphiporus leuciodus Coe, 1901
- Amphiporus macracanthus Coe, 1905
- Amphiporus maculosus Coe, 1944
- Amphiporus mathai Joubin, 1905
- Amphiporus matuanus Korotkevich, 1977
- Amphiporus mesosorus Verrill, 1892
- Amphiporus mortonmilleri Gibson, 2002
- Amphiporus moseleyi Hubrecht, 1887
- Amphiporus multihastatus Joubin, 1910
- Amphiporus multisorus Verrill, 1892
- Amphiporus murmanicum Ushakov, 1928
- Amphiporus musculus Iwata, 1954
- Amphiporus nadtochiae Chernyshev, 1998
- Amphiporus nebulosus Coe, 1901
- Amphiporus novaezelandiae (Quoy & Gaimard, 1833)
- Amphiporus ochraceus (Verrill, 1873)
- Amphiporus parvus Yamaoka, 1940
- Amphiporus paulinus Punnett, 1901
- Amphiporus perrieri Joubin, 1902
- Amphiporus peruvianus Coe, 1940
- Amphiporus racovitzai Bürger, 1904
- Amphiporus regius Iwata, 1954
- Amphiporus rhomboidalis (Stimpson, 1855)
- Amphiporus rubropunctus McCaul, 1963
- Amphiporus sanguineus Girard, 1853
- Amphiporus similis Coe, 1905
- Amphiporus sinuosus (Stimpson, 1857)
- Amphiporus spinosissimus Bürger, 1893
- Amphiporus spinosus Bürger, 1893
- Amphiporus stimpsonii (Girard in Stimpson, 1854)
- Amphiporus tetrasorus Verrill, 1892
- Amphiporus texanus Coe, 1951
- Amphiporus tigrinus Coe, 1901
- Amphiporus tuba (Corrêa, 1957)
- Amphiporus typicus (Diesing, 1862)
- Amphiporus vaillanti Joubin, 1902
