= Carinomidae =

Scientific classification
- Domain: Eukaryota
- Kingdom: Animalia
- Phylum: Nemertea
- Class: Palaeonemertea
- Family: Carinomidae

Family of ribbon worms

Carinomidae is a family of worms belonging to the order Palaeonemertea.

Genera:

- Carinoma Oudemans, 1885
- Carinomella Coe, 1905
- Statolitonemertes Korotkevich, 1982
