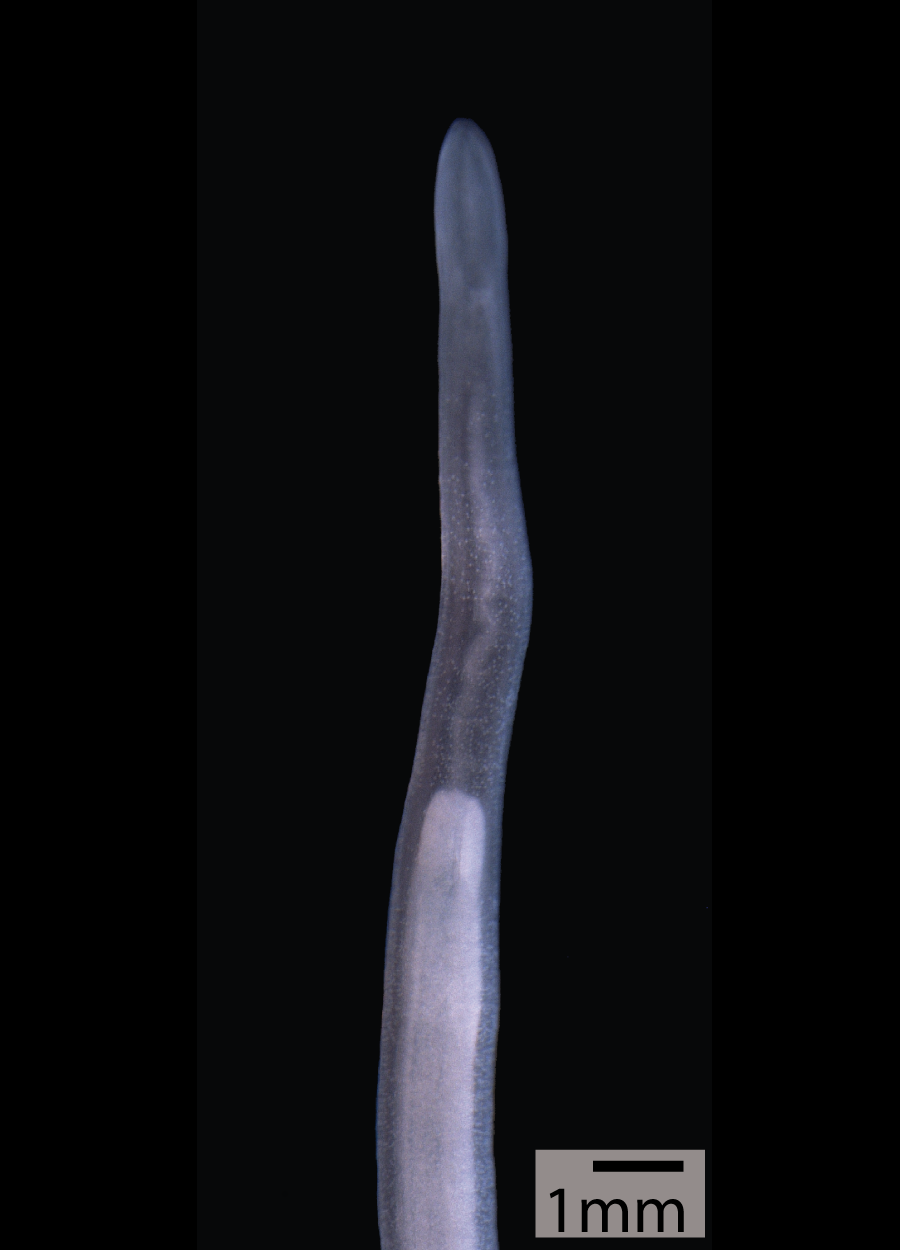
- Cephalothrix filiformis

Scientific classification
- Kingdom: Animalia
- Phylum: Nemertea
- Class: Palaeonemertea
- Family: Cephalothricidae
- Genus: Cephalothrix; Örsted, 1843

= Cephalothrix =

Genus of ribbon worms

Cephalothrix is a genus of nemerteans belonging to the family Cephalothricidae. The genus has cosmopolitan distribution. Some species, such as Cephalotrix simula, carry a high amount of tetrodotoxin (TTX), a deadly neurotoxin found in pufferfish venom. They hunt molluscs for food and eat small algae and plant matter, they are commonly found on or near oysters or under rocks during low tide. The genus was established in 1843 by Orsted, and has been found in Japan, near the Hiroshima Bay, North America, the United Kingdom, near Cornwall, and the Netherlands. These worms are long, thin and unsegmented, and evolve from eggs into a short larval stage before growing into adulthood.

== Species ==
Species:

- Cephalothrix adriatica (Senz, 1993)
- Cephalothrix alba (Gibson & Sundberg, 1992)
- Cephalothrix aliena (Punnett, 1903)
- Cephalothrix simula (Iwate, 1953)
- Cephalothrix filiformis (Johnston, 1828)
