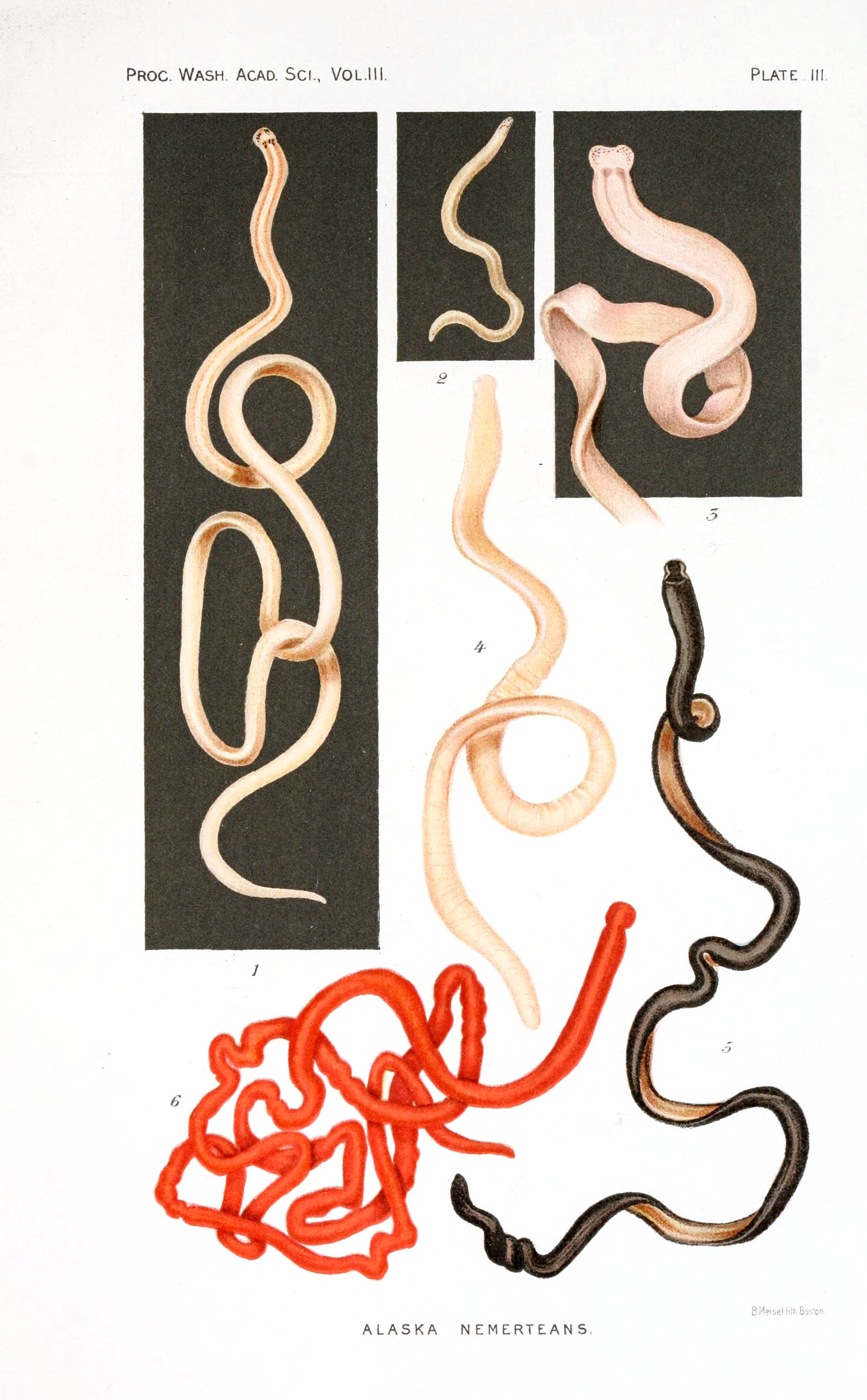
- Tubulanus polymorphus at bottom left

Scientific classification
- Kingdom: Animalia
- Phylum: Nemertea
- Class: Palaeonemertea
- Order: Tubulaniformes
- Family: Tubulanidae
- Genus: Tubulanus; Renier, 1804

Species
- See text

Synonyms
- Carinella Johnston, 1833

= Tubulanus =

Genus of ribbon worms

Tubulanus is a genus of primitive nemertean worms in the order Palaeonemertea.

== Species ==
The World Register of Marine Species includes the following species in the genus:

- Tubulanus albocinctus (Coe, 1904)
- Tubulanus annulatus (Montagu, 1804)
- Tubulanus aureus (Joubin, 1904)
- Tubulanus borealis (Friedrich, 1936)
- Tubulanus capistratus (Coe, 1901)
- Tubulanus cingulatus (Coe, 1904)
- Tubulanus ezoensis (Yamaoka, 1940)
- Tubulanus floridanus (Coe, 1951)
- Tubulanus frenatus (Coe, 1904)
- Tubulanus groenlandicus (Bergendal, 1902)
- Tubulanus holorhynchocoelomicus (Friedrich, 1958)
- Tubulanus hylbomi (Gibson & Sundberg, 1999)
- Tubulanus izuensis (Hookabe, Asai, Nakano, Kimura & Kajihara, 2020)
- Tubulanus linearis (McIntosh, 1874)
- Tubulanus longivasculus (Gibson & Sundberg, 1999)
- Tubulanus lucidus (Iwata, 1952)
- Tubulanus lutescens (Cantell, 2001)
- Tubulanus mawsoni (Wheeler, 1940)
- Tubulanus misakiensis (Hookabe & Kajihara, 2022)
- Tubulanus norvegicus (Senz, 1993)
- Tubulanus panormitanus (Monastero, 1930)
- Tubulanus pellucidus (Coe, 1895)
- Tubulanus polymorphus (Renier, 1804)
- Tubulanus punctatus (Takakura, 1898)
- Tubulanus rhabdotus (Corrêa, 1954)
- Tubulanus riceae (Ritger & Norenburg, 2006)
- Tubulanus roretzi (Senz, 1997)
- Tubulanus ruber (Griffin, 1898)
- Tubulanus rubicundus (Bürger, 1892)
- Tubulanus sexlineatus (Griffin, 1898)
- Tubulanus superbus (Kölliker, 1845)
- Tubulanus tamias (Kajihara, Kakui, Yamasaki & Hiruta, 2015)
- Tubulanus tubicola (Kennel, 1891)
