= Oerstedia =

Scientific classification
- Kingdom: Animalia
- Phylum: Nemertea
- Class: Hoplonemertea
- Order: Monostilifera
- Family: Oerstediidae
- Genus: Oerstedia; Quatrefages, 1846

Genus of worms

Oerstedia is a genus of worms belonging to the family Oerstediidae.

The species of this genus are found in Europe, North America.

Species:

- Oerstedia crassus (Senz, 1993)
- Oerstedia dorsalis (Abildgaard, 1806)
- Oerstedia esbenseni (Wheeler, 1934)
- Oerstedia gulliveri (Bürger, 1893)
- Oerstedia immutabilis (Riches, 1893)
- Oerstedia laminariae Friedrich, 1936
- Oerstedia maculata de Quatrefages de Bréau, 1846
- Oerstedia nigra (Riches, 1893)
- Oerstedia oculata (Kulikova, 1987)
- Oerstedia patriciae Oxner, 1907
- Oerstedia phoresiae (Kulikova, 1987)
- Oerstedia polyorbis Iwata, 1954
- Oerstedia roscoviensis Oxner, 1907
- Oerstedia rustica (Joubin, 1890)
- Oerstedia similiformis (Friedrich, 1935)
- Oerstedia striata Sundberg, 1988
- Oerstedia tenuicollis (Kirsteuer, 1963)
- Oerstedia valentinae (Chernyshev, 1993)
- Oerstedia venusta Iwata, 1954
- Oerstedia verae (Chernyshev, 1993)
- Oerstedia wheeleri Chernyshev, 1992
- Oerstedia wijnhoffae Friedrich, 1935
- Oerstedia zebra (Chernyshev, 1993)
