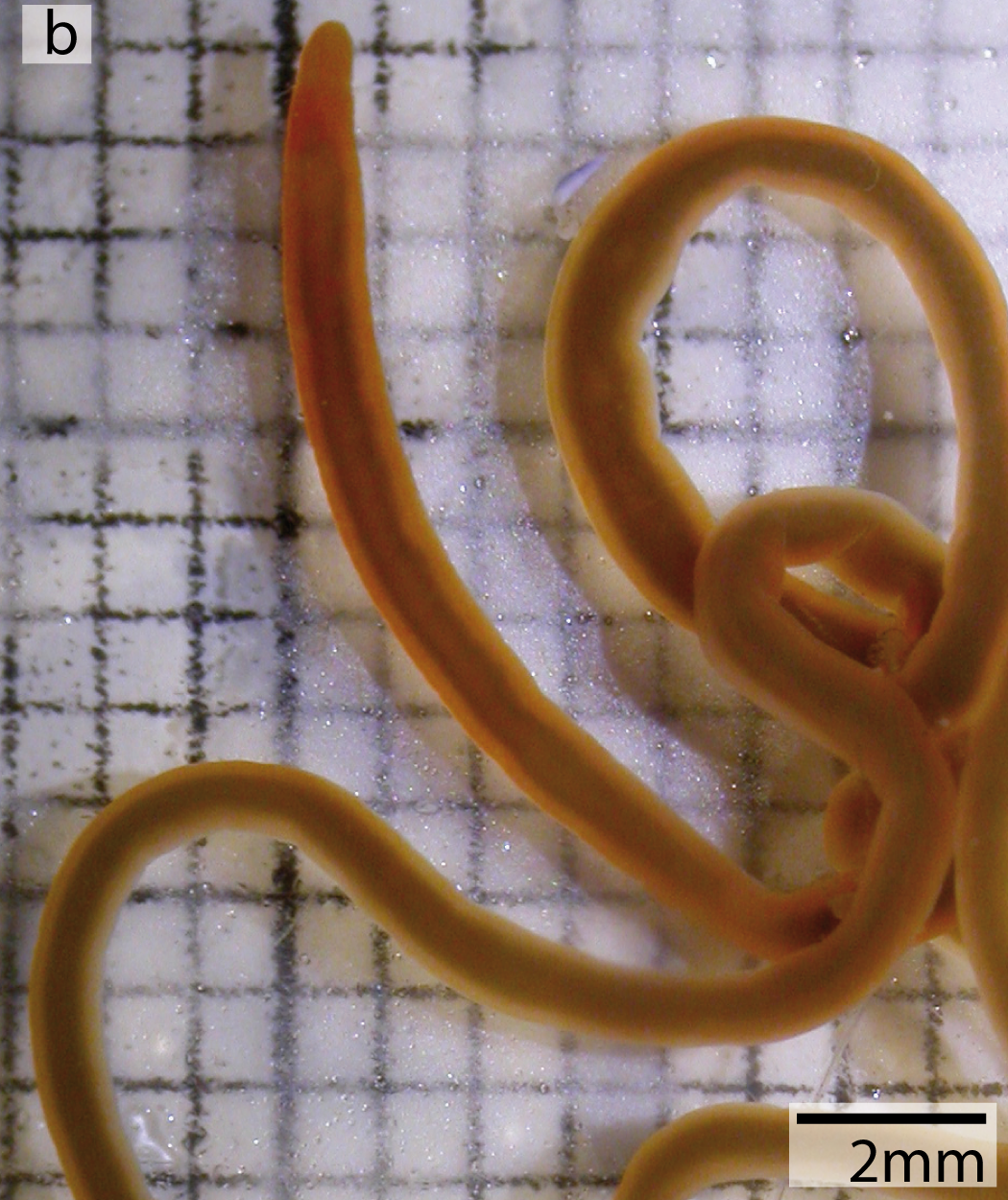
- Cephalothrix linearis

Scientific classification
- Domain: Eukaryota
- Kingdom: Animalia
- Phylum: Nemertea
- Class: Palaeonemertea
- Family: Cephalothricidae

= Cephalothricidae =

Family of ribbon worms

Cephalothricidae is a family of worms belonging to the order Palaeonemertea.

Genera:

- Astemma Örsted, 1843
- Balionemertes Sundberg, Gibson & Olsson, 2003
- Cephalothrix Örsted, 1843
