= Oerstediidae =

Scientific classification
- Domain: Eukaryota
- Kingdom: Animalia
- Phylum: Nemertea
- Class: Hoplonemertea
- Order: Monostilifera
- Infraorder: Oerstediina
- Family: Oerstediidae

Family of ribbon worms

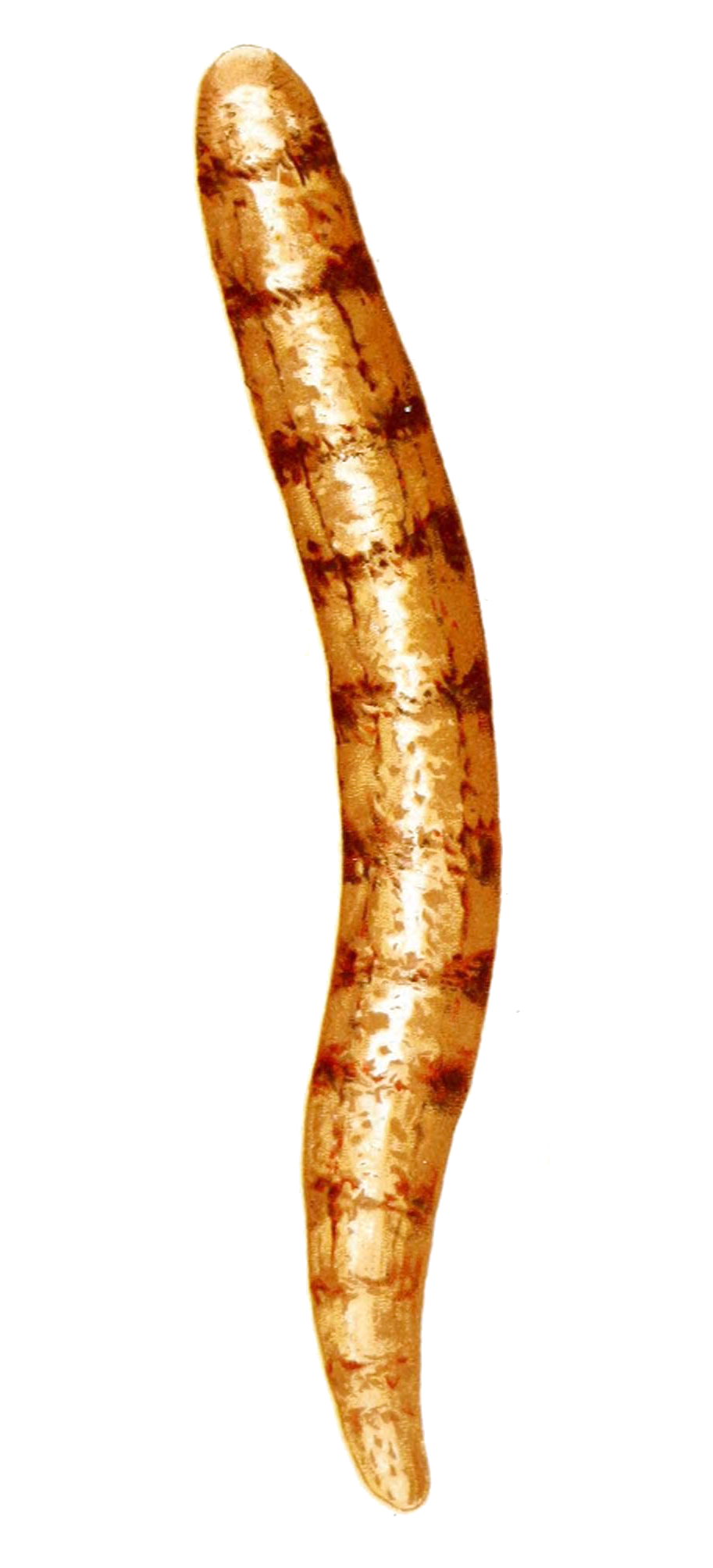

Oerstediidae is a family of worms belonging to the order Monostilifera.

Genera:

- Friedrichia Kirsteuer, 1965
- Oerstedia Quatrefages, 1846
- Typhloerstedia Chernyshev, 1999
