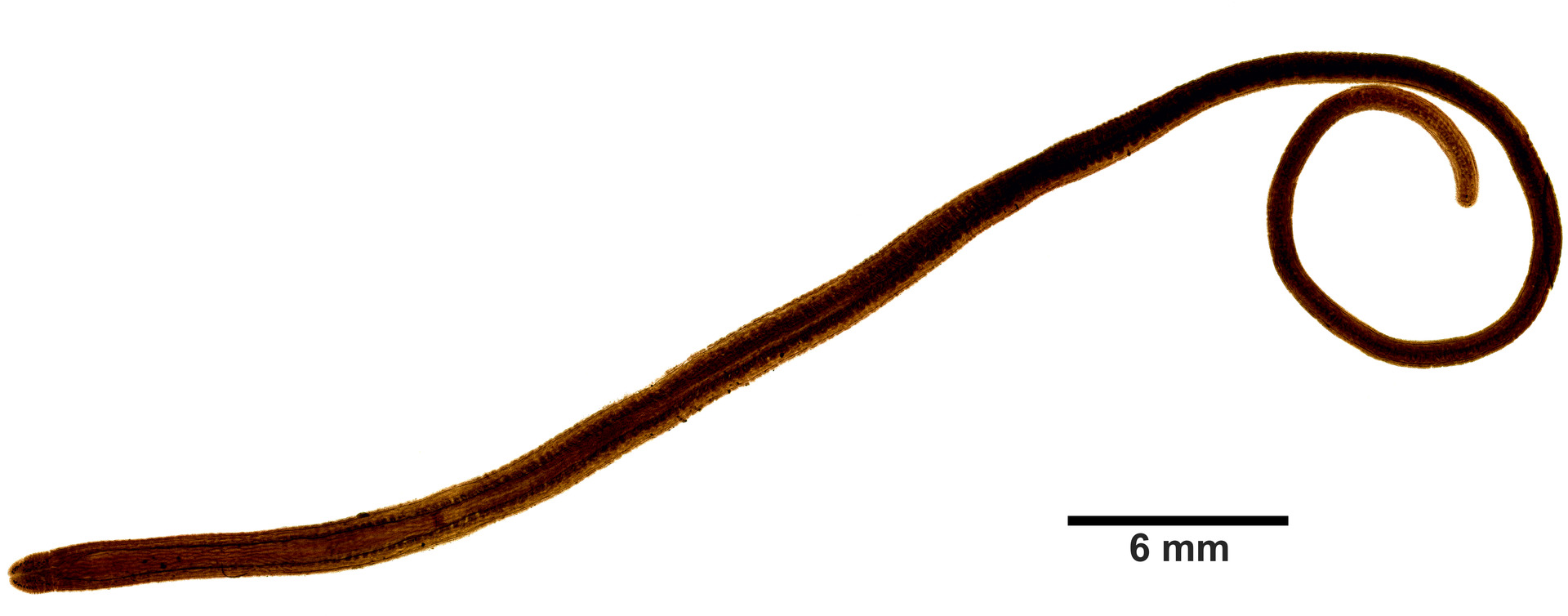
- Amphiporus leuciodus

Scientific classification
- Domain: Eukaryota
- Kingdom: Animalia
- Phylum: Nemertea
- Class: Hoplonemertea
- Order: Monostilifera
- Infraorder: Amphiporina
- Family: Amphiporidae

= Amphiporidae =

Family of ribbon worms

Amphiporidae is a family of ribbonworms belonging to the order Hoplonemertea.

== Genera ==
The family contains the following valid genus names, in addition to numerous synonyms:

- Aegialonemertes Gibson, 1990
- Alaonemertes Stiasny-Wijnhoff, 1942
- Amphiporus Ehrenberg, 1831
- Dananemertes Friedrich, 1957
- Duosnemertes Friedrich, 1955
- Furugelmina Chernyshev, 1998
- Nemertovema Chernyshev & Polyakova, 2018
- Parischyronemertes Gibson, 2002
- Proamphiporus Chernyshev & Polyakova, 2019
- Proneurotes Montgomery, 1897
- Psammamphiporus Gibson, 1989
- Thallassionemertes Gibson & Sundberg, 2001
