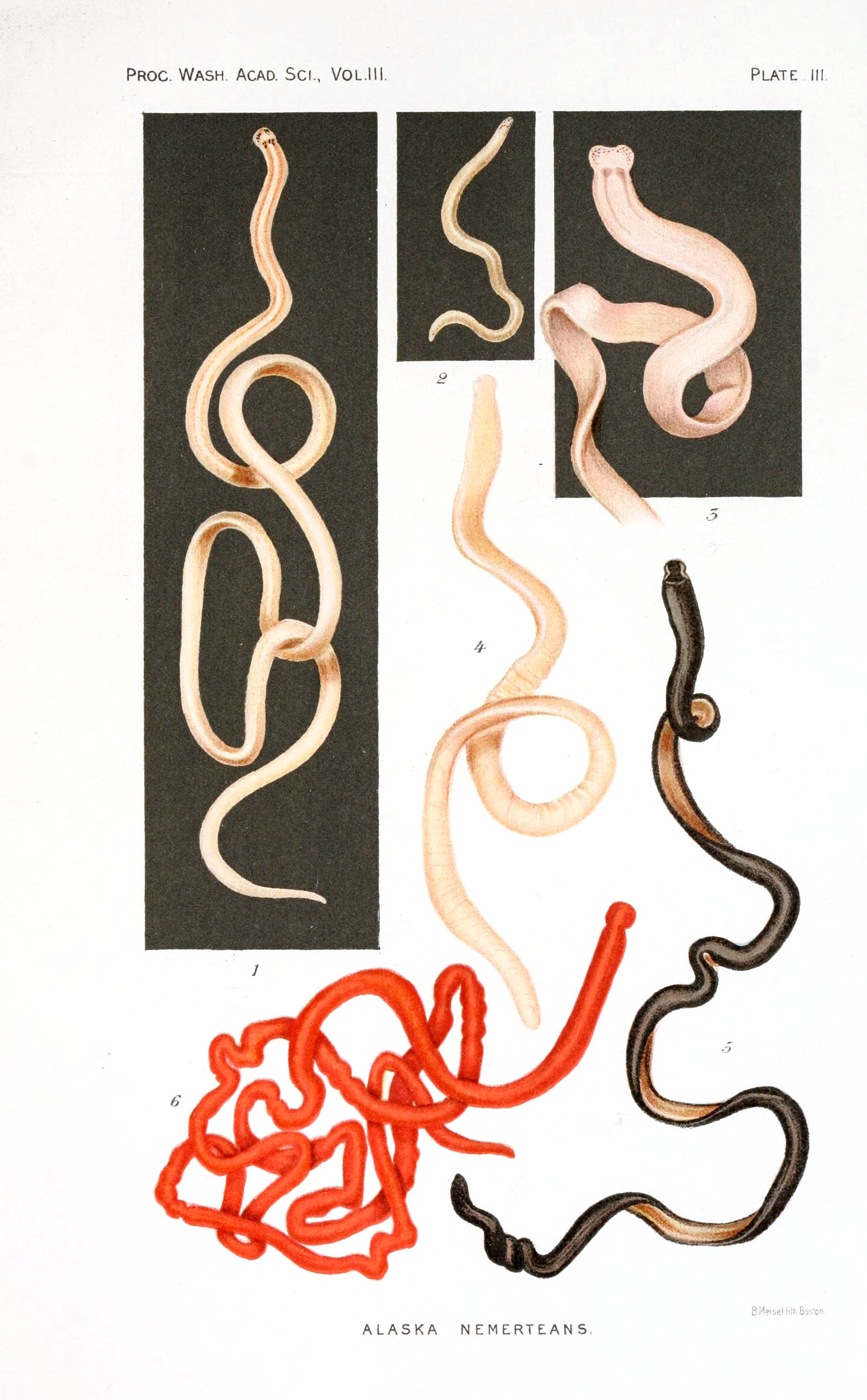
- Tubulanus polymorphus at bottom left

Scientific classification
- Kingdom: Animalia
- Phylum: Nemertea
- Class: Palaeonemertea
- Order: Tubulaniformes
- Family: Tubulanidae

Genera
- See text

= Tubulanidae =

Family of ribbon worms

Tubulanidae is a family of primitive nemertean worms in the order Palaeonemertea.

== Characteristics ==
Worms in this family have slightly flattened, rounded heads and approximately cylindrical bodies. Apart from the genera, Callinera and Carinina, worms in this family have paired cerebral sensory organs located on either side of the constriction where the head joins the body. Some species are red or brown, often with distinctive white bands or longitudinal stripes, but others are small and so translucent that their cerebral organs can be seen through the skin.

== Genera ==
The World Register of Marine Species includes the following genera in the group:

- Callinera Bergendal, 1900
- Carinesta Punnett, 1900
- Carinina Hubrecht, 1885
- Parahubrechtia Gibson & Sundberg, 1999
- Protubulanus Chernyshev, 1995
- Tubulanus Renier, 1804
