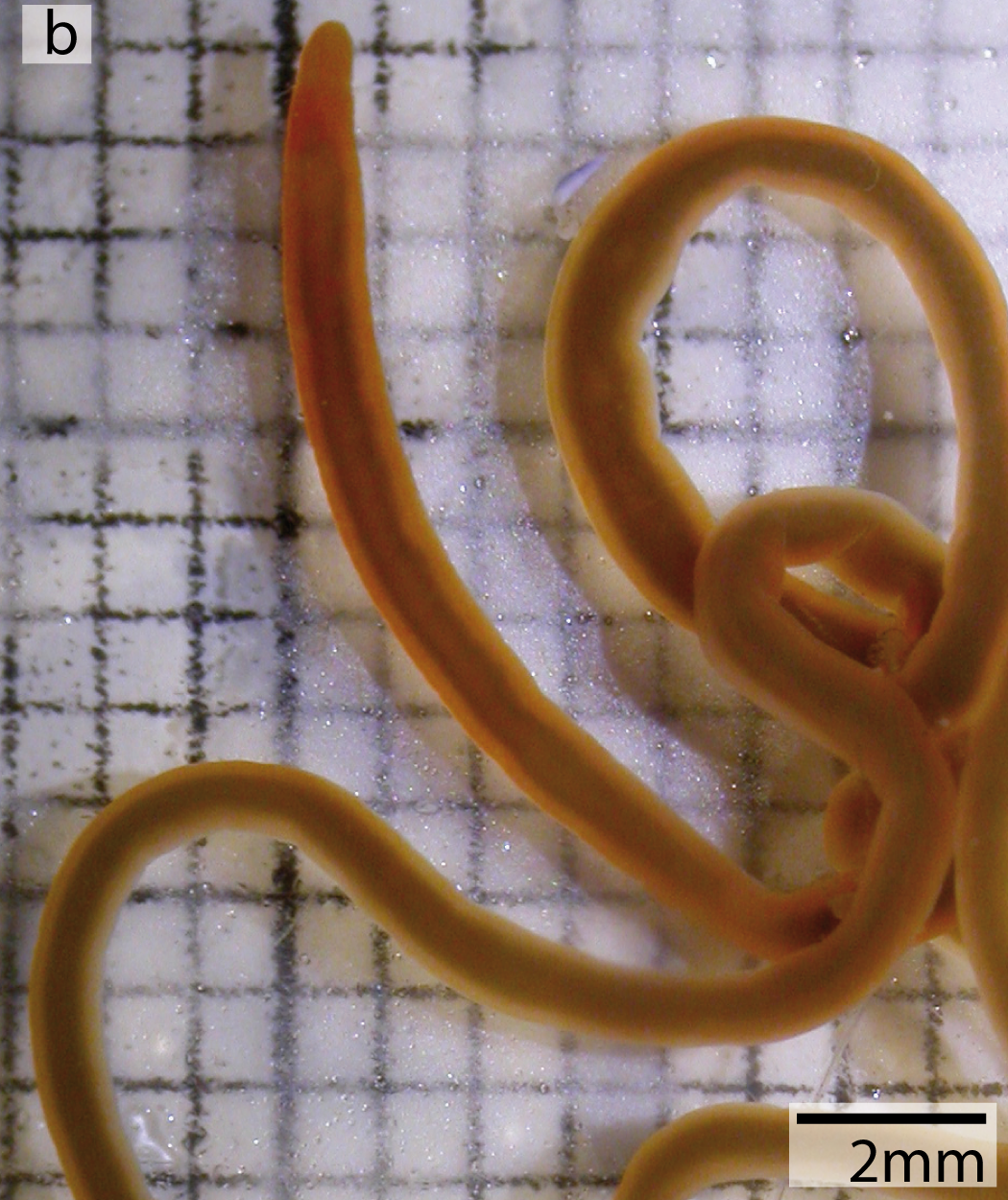
- Cephalothrix linearis

Scientific classification
- Domain: Eukaryota
- Kingdom: Animalia
- Phylum: Nemertea
- Superclass: Pronemertea; Chernyshev, 2021
- Class: Palaeonemertea; Hubrecht, 1879

Orders and families
- See text

= Palaeonemertea =

Order of ribbon worms

Palaeonemertea is a class of primitive nemertean worm. It may be para- or polyphyletic, consisting of three to five clades and totalling about 100 species.

These worms have several apparently simple features and, as their name suggests, they are often considered to be the most primitive nemerteans. The primary body-wall musculature consists of an outer circular layer overlying a longitudinal layer.

The group includes genera such as Cephalothrix in which the nerve cords are inside the body-wall longitudinal muscle, and Tubulanus, in which the nerve cords are between the outer circular muscle and the epidermis. Tubulanids are commonly encountered in rocky areas of intertidal zones in the northern hemisphere. They are often bright orange or have very distinctive banding and or stripes and can be many metres long, although only a few millimetres thick.

== Taxonomy ==
Chernyshev (2021) placed the group in its own superclass Pronemertea, and included the following three orders and six families in the group:

- Carinomiformes
  - Carinomidae
  - Carininidae
- Tubulaniformes
  - Tubulanidae
  - Carinomellidae
- Archinemertea
  - Cephalotrichidae
  - Cephalotrichellidae
