= Tubulaniformes =

Scientific classification
- Kingdom: Animalia
- Phylum: Nemertea
- Class: Palaeonemertea
- Order: Tubulaniformes

Order of ribbon worms

Tubulaniformes is an order of worms belonging to the class Palaeonemertea.

Families:

- Callineridae Bergendal, 1901
- Carinomellidae Chernyshev, 1995
- Tubulanidae Bürger, 1905
