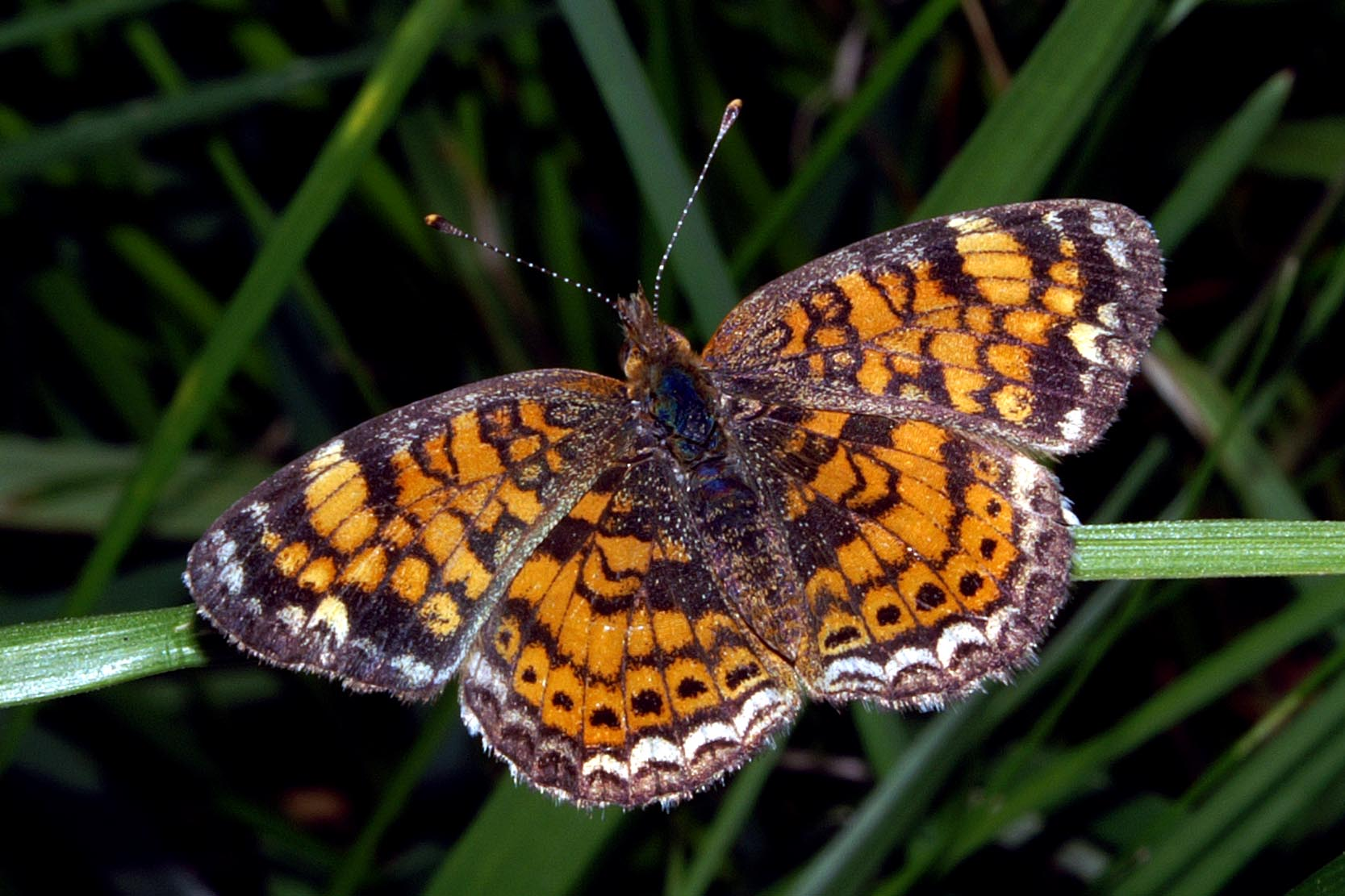
- Pearl crescent (Phyciodes tharos)

Scientific classification
- Domain: Eukaryota
- Kingdom: Animalia
- Phylum: Arthropoda
- Class: Insecta
- Order: Lepidoptera
- Family: Nymphalidae
- Subfamily: Nymphalinae
- Tribe: Melitaeini; Newman, 1870

Genera
- Numerous, see text

Synonyms
- Melitaeinae

= Melitaeini =

Genus of butterflies

Melitaeini are a group of brush-footed butterflies. Usually classified as a tribe of the Nymphalinae, they are sometimes raised to subfamily status as Melitaeinae. Common names include the highly ambiguous fritillaries (also used for some Heliconiinae), checkerspots, crescents, or crescentspots, and some genus-specific names.

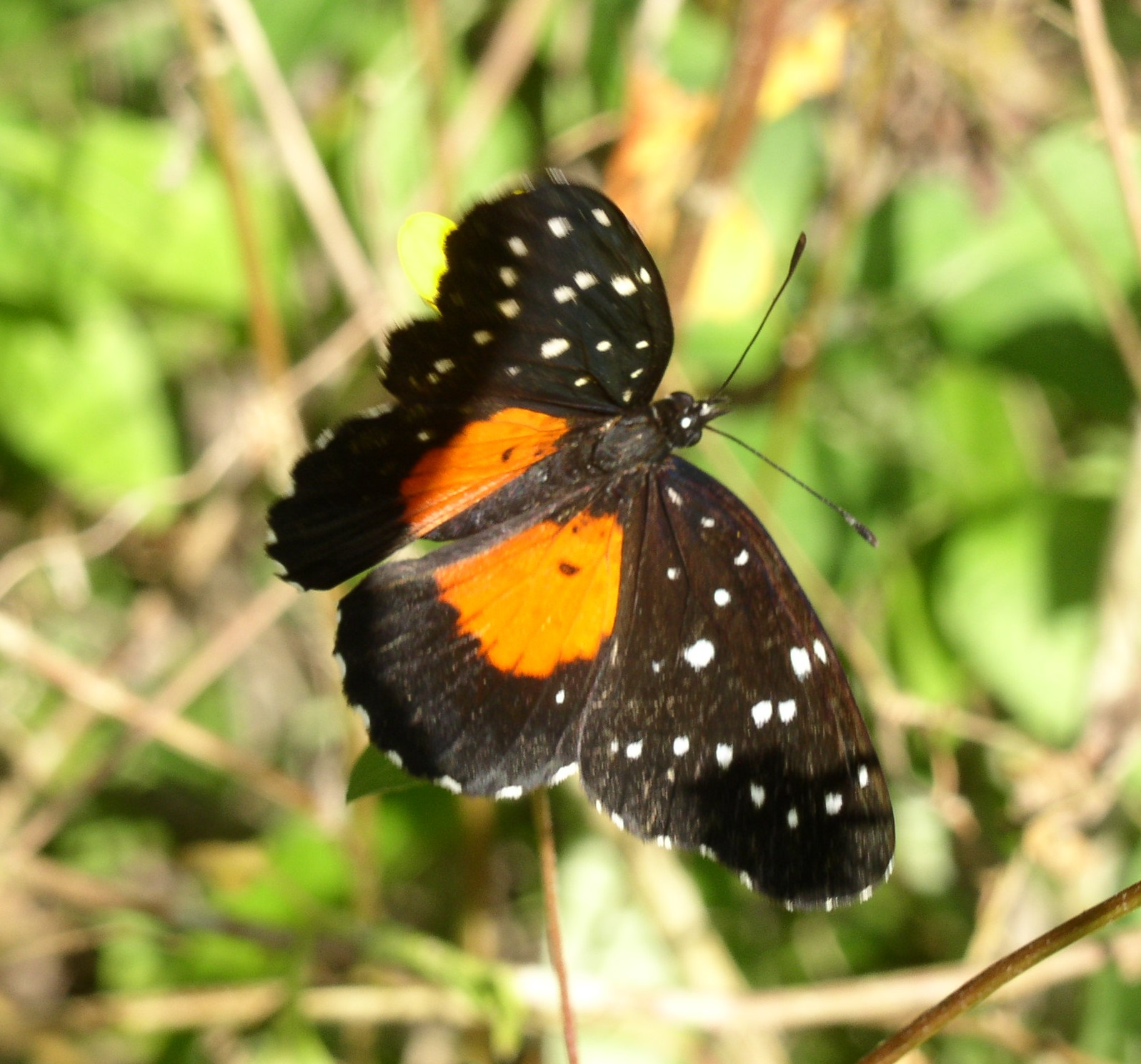
Chlosyne janais, Campeche, Mexico

== Genera ==
The 20–25 genera of Melitaeini are divided among five subtribes; some species are also listed. The subtribes, in the presumed phylogenetic sequence, are:

Subtribe Euphydryina

- Euphydryas – fritillaries, checkerspots

Subtribe Melitaeina

- Melitaea – fritillaries (including Didymaeformis, Mellicta)

Subtribe Chlosynina

- Antillea Higgins, [1959]
- Atlantea Higgins, [1959]
- Chlosyne – checkerspots, patches
- Dymasia Higgins, 1960
- Higginsius Hemming, 1964 (tentatively placed here; Gnathotrichina?)
- Microtia Bates, 1864
- Poladryas Bauer, 1975
- Texola Higgins, 1959 – checkerspots
  - Texola elada – Elada checkerspot

Subtribe Gnathotrichina

- Gnathotriche C. & R. Felder, 1862

Subtribe Phyciodina

- Anthanassa Scudder, 1875 – crescents, crescentspots
  - Anthanassa ardys – Ardys crescent
  - Anthanassa frisia – Cuban crescent, Cuban crescentspot
- Castilia Higgins, 1981
- Dagon Higgins, 1981
- Eresia Boisduval, 1836
- Janatella Higgins, 1981
- Mazia Higgins, 1981
- Ortilia Higgins, 1981
- Phyciodes – crescents, crescentspots
- Phystis Higgins, 1981
- Tegosa Higgins, 1981
  - Tegosa anieta
- Telenassa Higgins, 1981
- Tisona Higgins, 1981
