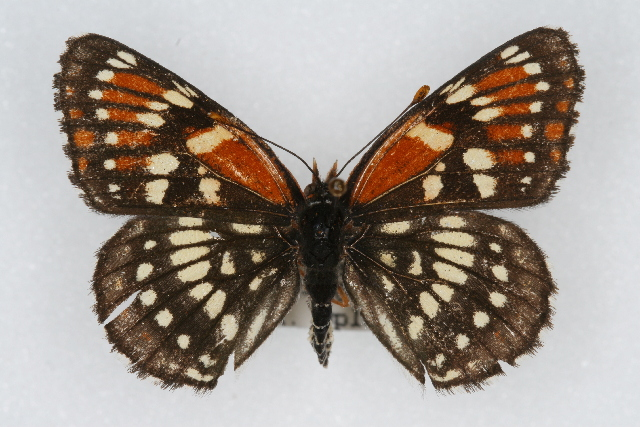

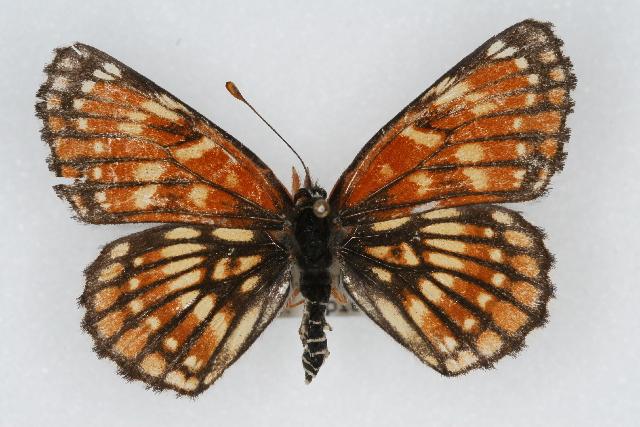

Scientific classification
- Domain: Eukaryota
- Kingdom: Animalia
- Phylum: Arthropoda
- Class: Insecta
- Order: Lepidoptera
- Family: Nymphalidae
- Genus: Chlosyne
- Species: C. leanira

Binomial name
- Chlosyne leanira (C. & R. Felder, 1860)

Synonyms
- Melitaea leanira C. & R. Felder, 1860; Thessalia daviesi Wind, 1947; Melitaea cerrita Wright, 1905

= Chlosyne leanira =

Leanira checkerspot

Species of butterfly

Chlosyne leanira, the leanira checkerspot, is a butterfly of the family Nymphalidae. It is found in North America from western Oregon south to California, Nevada, Utah and western Colorado, as well as Baja California. The wingspan is 33–40 mm. Generally, females are larger than males, but males have a more apparent red color to their wings.

Adults feed on flower nectar while the larvae feed on Castilleja plants in the Orobanchaceae plant family, particularly the leaves and flowers of this host plant.

Young larvae live together in a loose web. Third-instar larvae hibernate, and examination of Chlosyne leanira in Gates Canyon, California revealed that they overwinter as larvae.

== Subspecies ==
Multiple subspecies of C. leanira have been identified:

- Chlosyne leanira oregonensis (Bauer, 1975) (Oregon)
- Chlosyne leanira leanira (C. Felder & R. Felder, 1860) (California)
- Chlosyne leanira obsoleta (Hy. Edwards, 1878) (California)
- Chlosyne leanira nebularum (Austin & M. Smith, 1998) (California)
- Chlosyne leanira elegans (Priestaf & J. Emmel, 1998) (California)
- Chlosyne leanira wrightii (W. H. Edwards, 1886) (California)
- Chlosyne leanira cerrita (Wright, 1905) (California)
- Chlosyne leanira alma (Strecker, 1878) (Arizona, Utah)
- Chlosyne leanira basinensis (Austin & M. Smith, 1998) (Nevada)
- Chlosyne leanira flavodorsalis (Austin & M. Smith, 1998) (California)
- Chlosyne leanira austrima (Austin & Smith, 1998) (Baja California)

== Phylogenetic relationships ==
=== Taxonomic relationships of Chlosyne and related genera ===
Phylogenetic relationships of butterfly species in the family Nymphalidae were analyzed using mitochondrial DNA sequences. Four species groups were found to be monophyletic: Euphydryas, Phyciodes, Chlosyne, and Melitaea groups. The following genera were found to be paraphyletic: Castilia, Didymaeformia, Eresia, Melitaea, and Thessalia.

=== Tribe Melitaeini ===
The tribe Melitaeini consists of about 250 species divided into five generic groups known as the Euphydryas, Phyciodes, Chlosyne, Gnathotriche, and Melitaea groups. Three subtribes were recognized in the tribe Melitaeini, which include Euphydryiti, Phycioditi, and Melitaeiti. The subtribe Melitaeiti includes the Chlosyne, Gnathotriche, and Melitaea groups. The Chlosyne group of species occurs in the Nearctic region, as do the Euphydryas and Phyciodes groups.

=== Chlosyne group ===
The Chlosyne group includes 30 species that were split into 5 genera. Most species were placed into the genus Chlosyne due to great similarity in male genitalia, but three species were placed into the genus Thessalia due to a difference in male genitalia. In a phylogenetic analysis of different butterfly species, Thessalia leanira was categorized under the Chlosyne group. The phylogenetic analysis also suggested that in the subtribe Melitaeiti (within the tribe Melitaeini), the genus Chlosyne is synonymous with Thessalia. However, the DNA sequences from species within Chlosyne exhibited great enough divergence to suggest that Chlosyne should be separate from Melitaeiti. While species in Thessalia appear to be basal and paraphyletic to Chlosyne in the predicted cladogram, Thessalia is still conservatively grouped within Chlosyne.

== Physical description ==
The wingspan of males has been described as 33-35 mm, and the wingspan of females has been described as 36-40 mm. The upper surface of the wings of both sexes is dark brown as the ground color; although the dark brown appears as small macules. The forewings have red scales at their base and apex. Red marginal lunules are also present on the forewings of both sexes, but they are best visualized in males. The under surface of the forewings has an orange-red ground color as well as pale and dark markings. The hindwings' undersurface has sub-basal fascia that extend across the costa, cell, and inner margin.

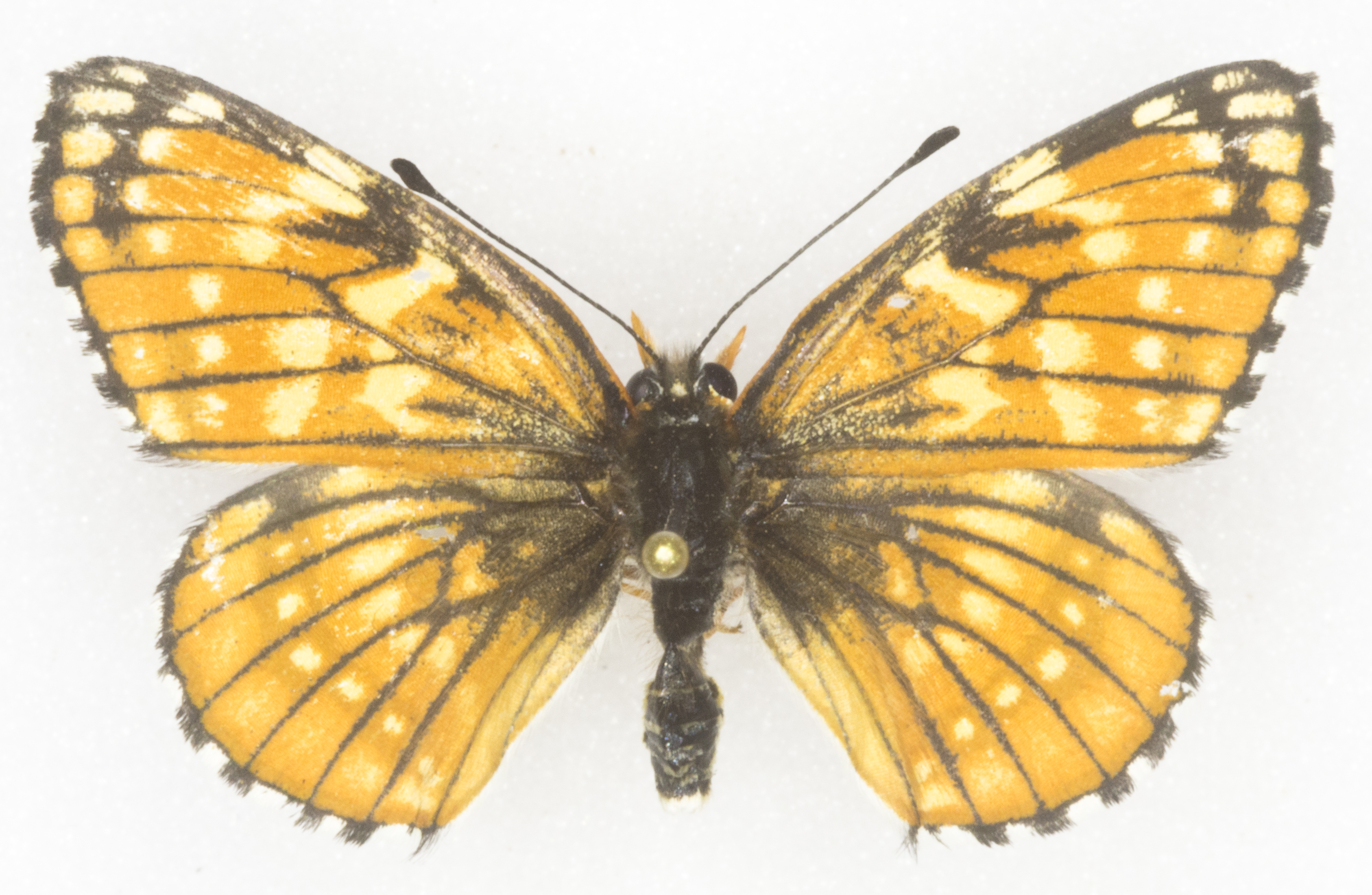
Upper surface of male C. leanira fulvadorsalis

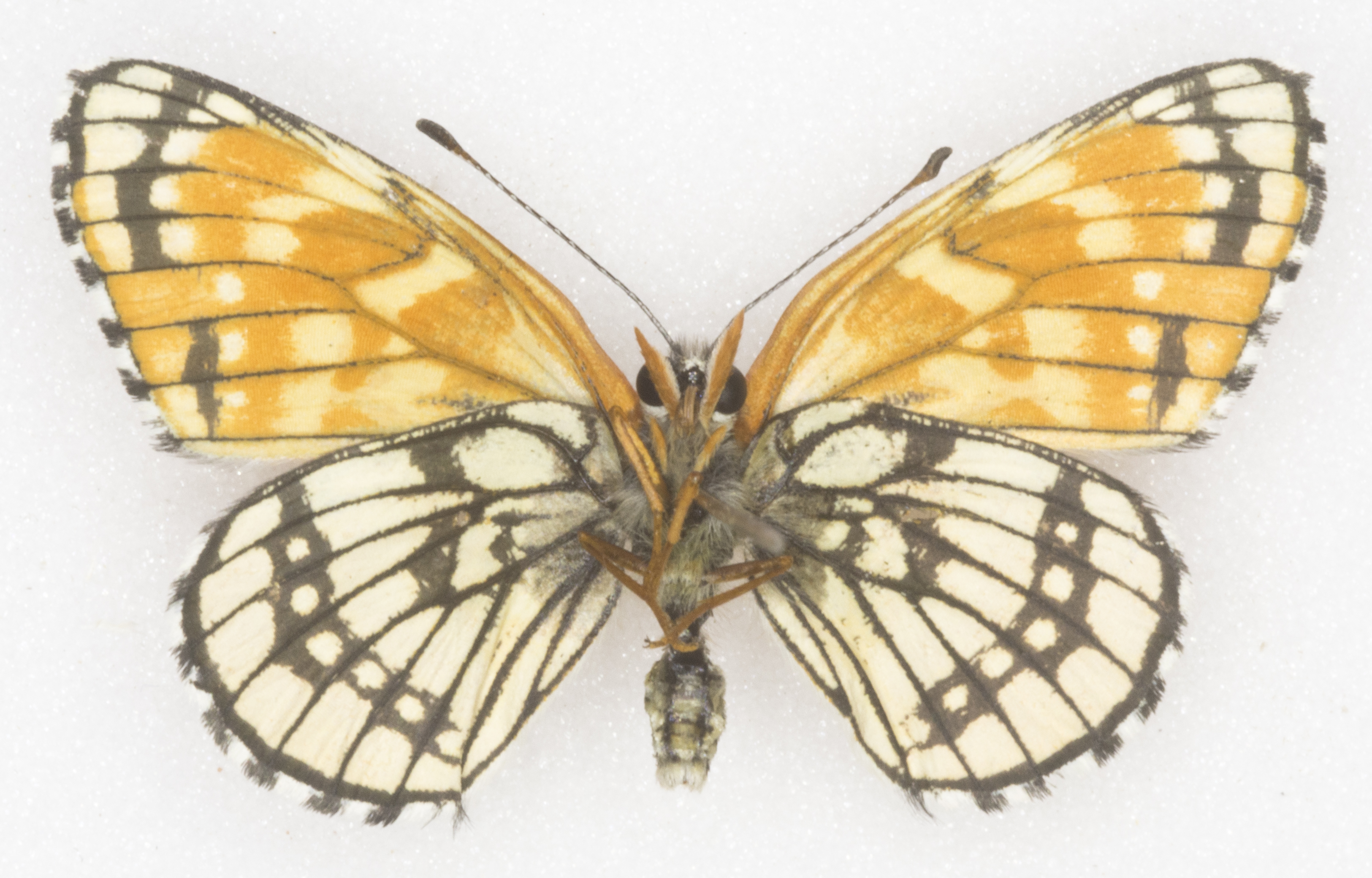
Under surface of male C. leanira fulvadorsalis

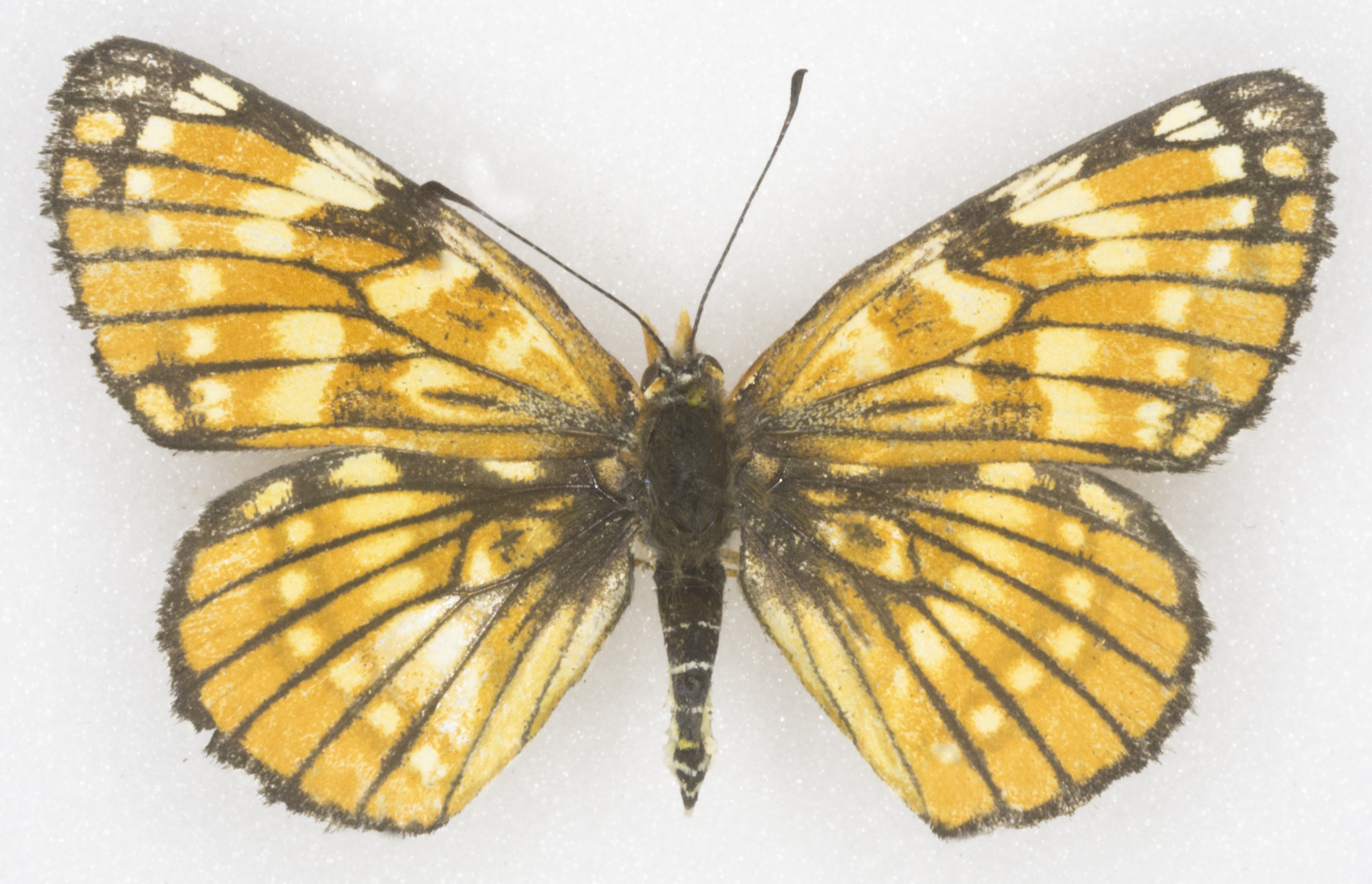
Upper surface of female C. leanira fulvadorsalis

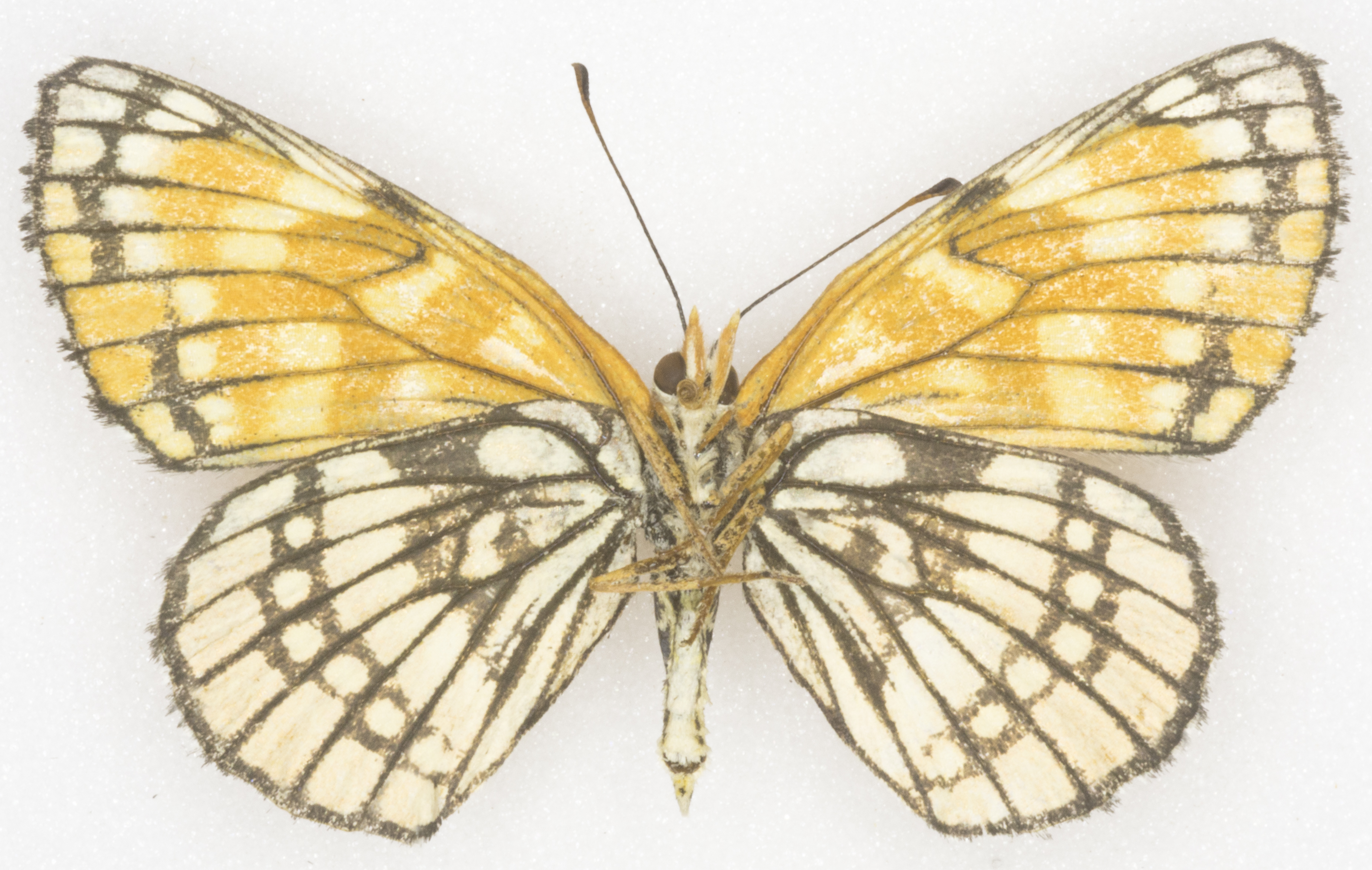
Under surface of female C. leanira fulvadorsalis

== Food ==
Adult Chlosyne leanira subspecies have a variety of flower preferences.

=== Chlosyne leanira fulvia ===
Thessalia leanira fulvia is synonymous to Chlosyne leanira fulvia. Chlosyne leanira fulvia larvae consume (Orobanchaceae) Castilleja integra, a flowering plant. Additionally, C. leanira fulvia prefers yellow or white flowers such as white to light rose-toned Allium textile, white Asteracaeae shrubs, white Ceanothus fendleri, yellow Heterotheca villosa, and white Nasturtium officinale.

=== Chlosyne leanira alma ===
C. leanira alma prefers white flowers such as Leucelene ericoides.

=== Chlosyne leanira leanira ===
C. leanira leanira prefers white Achillea millefolium lanulosa and yellow Asteraceae.

== Distribution ==
=== California ===
In an 8-year period, only 6 Chlosyne leanira wrighti were observed in Hall Canyon, which is located in Ventura, California. A survey of butterfly species in the Sutter Buttes mountain range in California's Central Valley did not uncover any C. leanira. Sutter Buttes is characterized by its long, hot summers and short, wet winters, with an annual precipitation of about 51 cm. It consists of grasslands, chaparral, oak woodland, and scattered wetlands.

However, C. leanira was detected at two sites similar to Sutter Buttes in a study comparing the presence of different butterfly species in three similar locations. The two sites were Gates Canyon in California and in the Sierra Nevada Range in Washington.

In another study, C. leanira was again seen in Gates Canyon, which is northeast of San Francisco. However, only one brood was observed between 1976 and 2002.

=== Oregon ===
C. leanira was also present in the Ashland Watershed Reserve, which is located in the Siskiyou Mountains in Oregon. The watershed includes mainly hardwood plants, and the mountains that the Ashland Watershed is located in is characterized by warm, dry summers and cool, moist winters with an annual precipitation of about 51 cm. Specifically, C. leanira was present in forest areas with prescribed fires, forest areas that had not burned since at least1978, and fuel break areas in Ashland Watershed.
