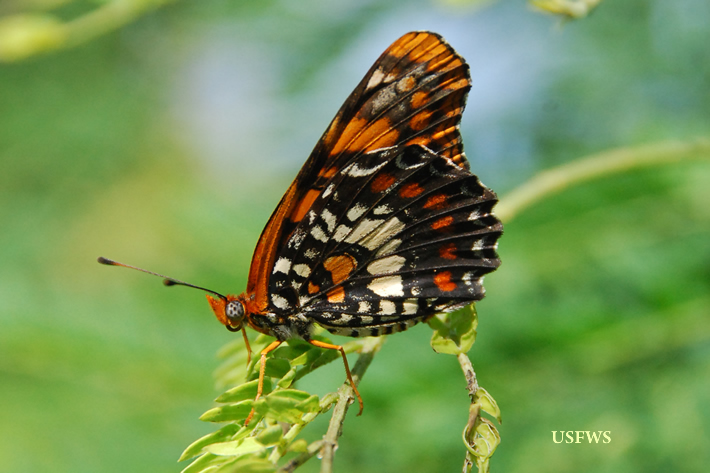

Conservation status
- Threatened (ESA)

Scientific classification
- Kingdom: Animalia
- Phylum: Arthropoda
- Clade: Pancrustacea
- Class: Insecta
- Order: Lepidoptera
- Family: Nymphalidae
- Genus: Atlantea
- Species: A. tulita

Binomial name
- Atlantea tulita (Dewitz, 1877)

Synonyms
- Synchloe tulita Dewitz, 1877

= Atlantea tulita =

Species of butterfly

Atlantea tulita is a rare species of butterfly known by the common name Puerto Rico harlequin butterfly (in Spanish, mariposa arlequín de Puerto Rico or quebradillana). This brush-footed butterfly is endemic to Puerto Rico. It is a candidate for United States federal protection as an endangered species. In 2011 a report found federal protection to be warranted, but it was precluded by other actions and it remains a candidate.

This butterfly has a wingspan of about 6 centimeters. The wings have a scattered harlequin pattern of orange, black, red, and white.

This species was described in 1877 from specimens collected in Quebradillas. Its historical range includes this municipality as well as Arecibo, Maricao, Sabana Grande, and Peñuelas. Only two populations remain today, those around Quebradillas and Maricao. It can be found in the Maricao Commonwealth Forest. The total population has been estimated to be fewer than 70 imagoes (adults) at any given time.

This butterfly lives in subtropical moist and wet forest habitat. The substrate is limestone and serpentine. The flora of the region includes Oplonia spinosa (prickly bush), Coccoloba uvifera (sea grape), Bourreria succulenta (palo de vaca), Lantana camara (cariaquillo), Lantana involucrata (buttonsage), Randia aculeata (tintillo), Vernonia albicaulis (Santa Maria), Poitea paucifolia (retama), Leucaena leucocephala (leucaena), Chromolaena odorata (Siam weed), Erithalis fructicosa (blacktorch), Distictis lactifolia (liana fragante), Bidens pilosa (Spanish needle), Croton rigidus (adormidera), Stachytarpheta jamaicensis (blue porterweed), Stigmaphyllon emarginatum (bull reed), and Tabebuia heterophylla (roble). The butterfly is considered a specialist species. The prickly bush, Oplonia spinosa, is the butterfly's only host for oviposition, and it only lays eggs on the new green stems of the plant. Then the larvae feed upon this plant species. Adult butterflies feed mostly on other plant species.

This rare butterfly is threatened by a number of factors, the most important of which is habitat destruction and modification caused by urban development in the species' region. The species' host plant is being removed. The area has high value for tourism-related construction. Also, the butterfly has what is considered "low reproductive capacity". Other threats include fire, herbicides, pesticides, and climate change.
