= Phystis =

Scientific classification
- Kingdom: Animalia
- Phylum: Arthropoda
- Class: Insecta
- Order: Lepidoptera
- Family: Nymphalidae
- Tribe: Melitaeini
- Genus: Phystis; Higgins, 1981
- Species: P. simois

Binomial name
- Phystis simois (Hewitson, 1864)

Synonyms
- Eresia simois Hewitson, 1864; Phyciodes pedrona Moulton, 1909; Phyciodes variegata Röber, 1913; Phyciodes simois var. nigrina Breyer, 1930; Phyciodes simois ab. nigrina Hayward, 1931; Phyciodes chinchipensis Hayward, 1964

Genus of butterflies

Phystis is a monotypic genus of butterflies from southern United States in the family Nymphalidae. It contains the species Phystis simois.

== Subspecies ==
- P. s. chinchipensis (Hayward, 1964) (Peru)
- P. s. pratti (Hall, 1935) (Peru)
- P. s. simois (Hewitson, 1864) (Brazil)
- P. s. variegata (Röber, 1913) (Brazil, Argentina, Uruguay, Bolivia, Peru)
