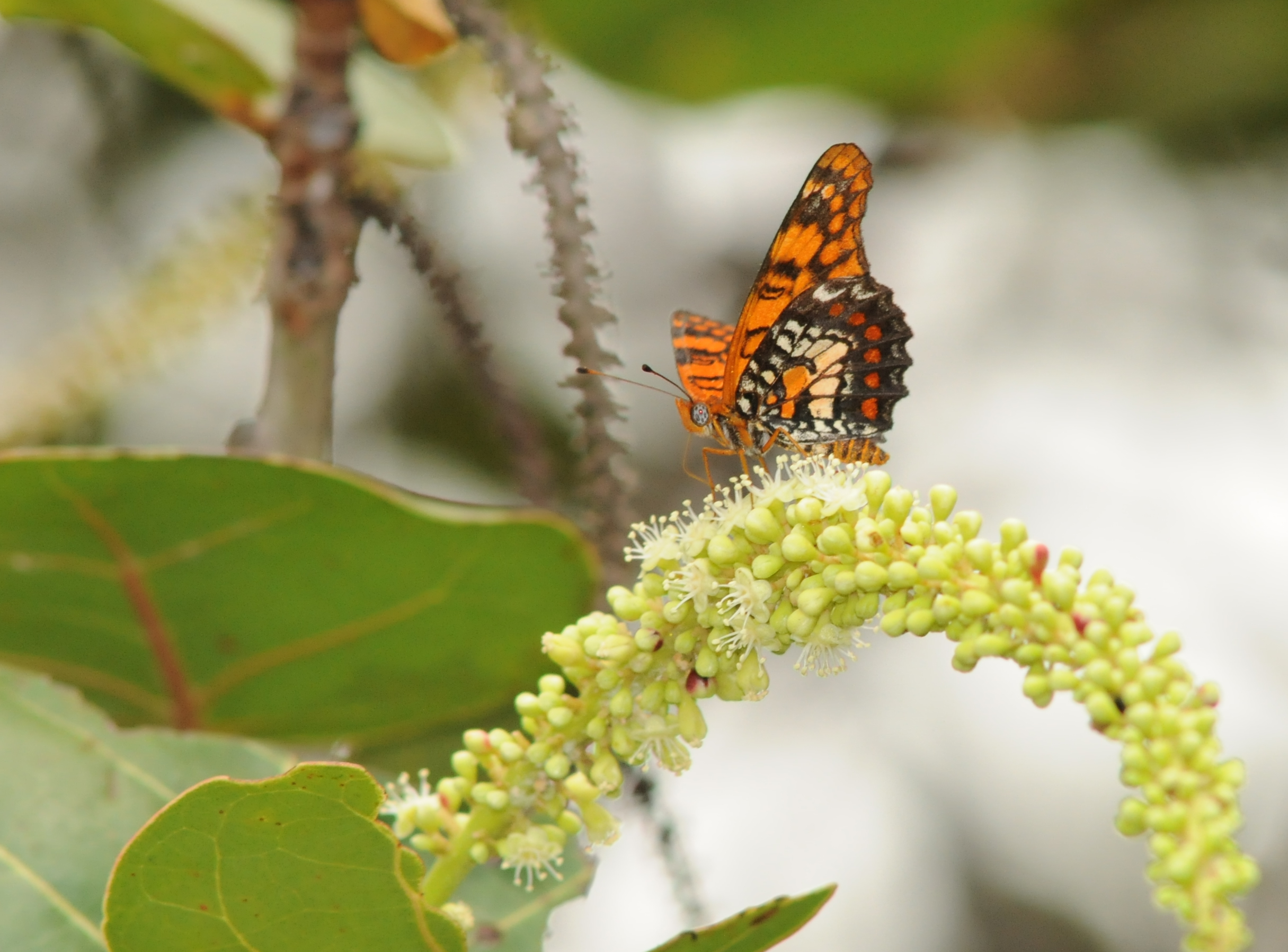
- Atlantea tulita

Scientific classification
- Kingdom: Animalia
- Phylum: Arthropoda
- Clade: Pancrustacea
- Class: Insecta
- Order: Lepidoptera
- Family: Nymphalidae
- Subfamily: Nymphalinae
- Tribe: Melitaeini
- Genus: Atlantea; Higgins, [1959]

= Atlantea =

Genus of butterflies from the Caribbean

Atlantea is a genus of butterflies from the Caribbean in the family Nymphalidae.

== Species ==
Listed alphabetically:

- Atlantea cryptadia Sommer & Schwartz, 1980 – Hispaniolan checkerspot (Hispaniola)
- Atlantea pantoni (Kaye, 1906) – Jamaican checkerspot (Jamaica)
- Atlantea perezi (Herrich-Schäffer, 1862) – Cuban checkerspot (Cuba)
- Atlantea tulita (Dewitz, 1877) – harlequin butterfly (Puerto Rico)
