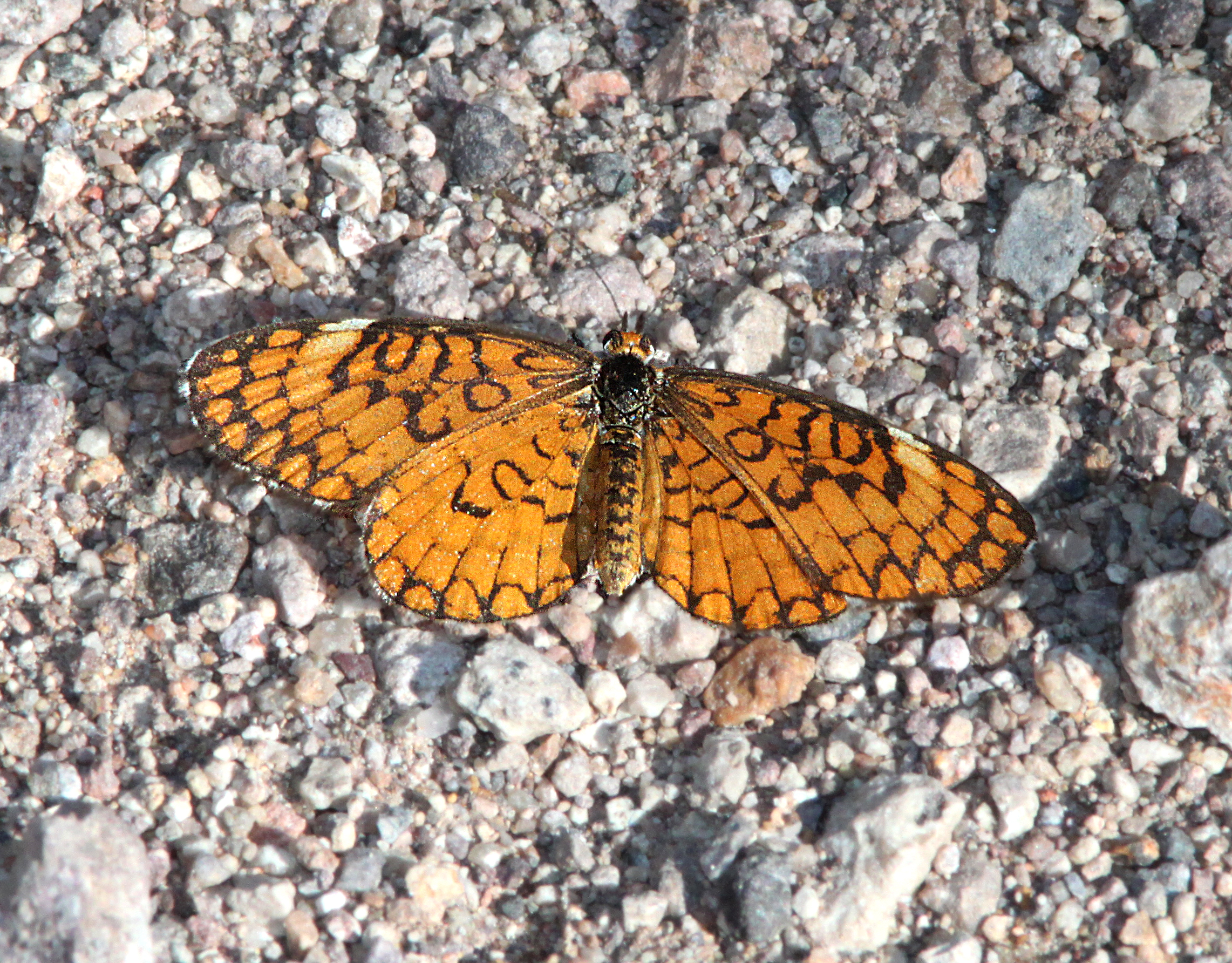

Scientific classification
- Domain: Eukaryota
- Kingdom: Animalia
- Phylum: Arthropoda
- Class: Insecta
- Order: Lepidoptera
- Family: Nymphalidae
- Tribe: Melitaeini; Higgins, 1960'
- Genus: Dymasia dymas (W.H. Edwards, 1877)

Synonyms
- Melitaea dymas W.H. Edwards, 1877; Melitaea larunda Strecker, [1878]; Melitaea senrabii Barnes, 1900; Melitaea chara W.H. Edwards, [1884]; Microtia imperialis Bauer, 1959; Melitaea chara ab. jacintoi Gunder, 1924; Melitaea chara ab. nitela Comstock, 1926

= Dymasia =

Tiny checkerspot

Genus of butterflies

Dymasia is a monotypic genus of butterflies in the family Nymphalidae. Its single species is the tiny checkerspot (Dymasia dymas), also known as the dyman checkerspot, which is found from the southern United States to Central America.

== Subspecies ==
- D. d. dymas – tiny checkerspot (Texas)
- D. d. chara (W.H. Edwards, [1884]) – Chara checkerspot (Arizona)
- D. d. imperialis (Bauer, 1959) (California)
