= Tisona =

Scientific classification
- Kingdom: Animalia
- Phylum: Arthropoda
- Class: Insecta
- Order: Lepidoptera
- Family: Nymphalidae
- Subfamily: Nymphalinae
- Tribe: Melitaeini
- Subtribe: Phyciodina
- Genus: Tisona; Higgins, 1981
- Species: T. saladillensis

Binomial name
- Tisona saladillensis (Giacomelli, 1911)

Synonyms
- Phyciodes saladillensis

Genus of butterflies

Tisona is a monotypic genus of butterflies in the family Nymphalidae that contains the species Tisona saladillensis found in South America.

== Subspecies ==
- Tisona saladillensis clarior Higgins, 1981 (Bolivia)
- Tisona saladillensis saladillensis (Argentina)
