= Higginsius fasciata =

Scientific classification
- Domain: Eukaryota
- Kingdom: Animalia
- Phylum: Arthropoda
- Class: Insecta
- Order: Lepidoptera
- Family: Nymphalidae
- Genus: Higginsius
- Species: H. fasciata

Binomial name
- Higginsius fasciata (Höpffer, 1874)

Species of butterfly

Higginsius fasciata is a species of butterfly.
