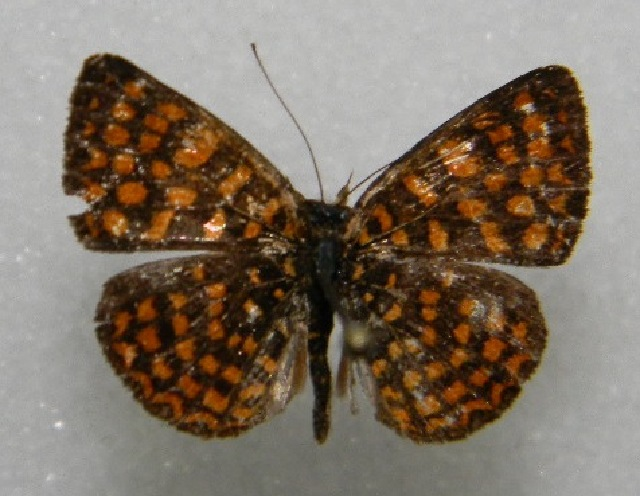

Scientific classification
- Domain: Eukaryota
- Kingdom: Animalia
- Phylum: Arthropoda
- Class: Insecta
- Order: Lepidoptera
- Family: Nymphalidae
- Genus: Antillea
- Species: A. pelops

Binomial name
- Antillea pelops (Drury, 1773)

Synonyms
- Papilio pelops Drury, [1773]; Argynnis pygmaea Godart, 1819; Papilio aegon Fabricius, 1781 (preocc. Denis & Schiffermüller, 1775); Erycina aedon Godart, [1824]

= Antillea pelops =

Species of butterfly

Antillea pelops is a butterfly of the family Nymphalidae. It is found in the Caribbean, including Cuba, Hispaniola, Jamaica, Puerto Rico, Montserrat and Saint Kitts.

The length of the forewings is 10–12 mm for males and 11–13 mm for females.

The larvae feed on Blechum pyramidatum and Justicia comata.

== Subspecies ==
- A. p. pelops
- A. p. anacaona (Herrich-Schäffer, 1865) (Cuba)
- A. p. pygmaea (Godart, 1819) (Jamaica)
