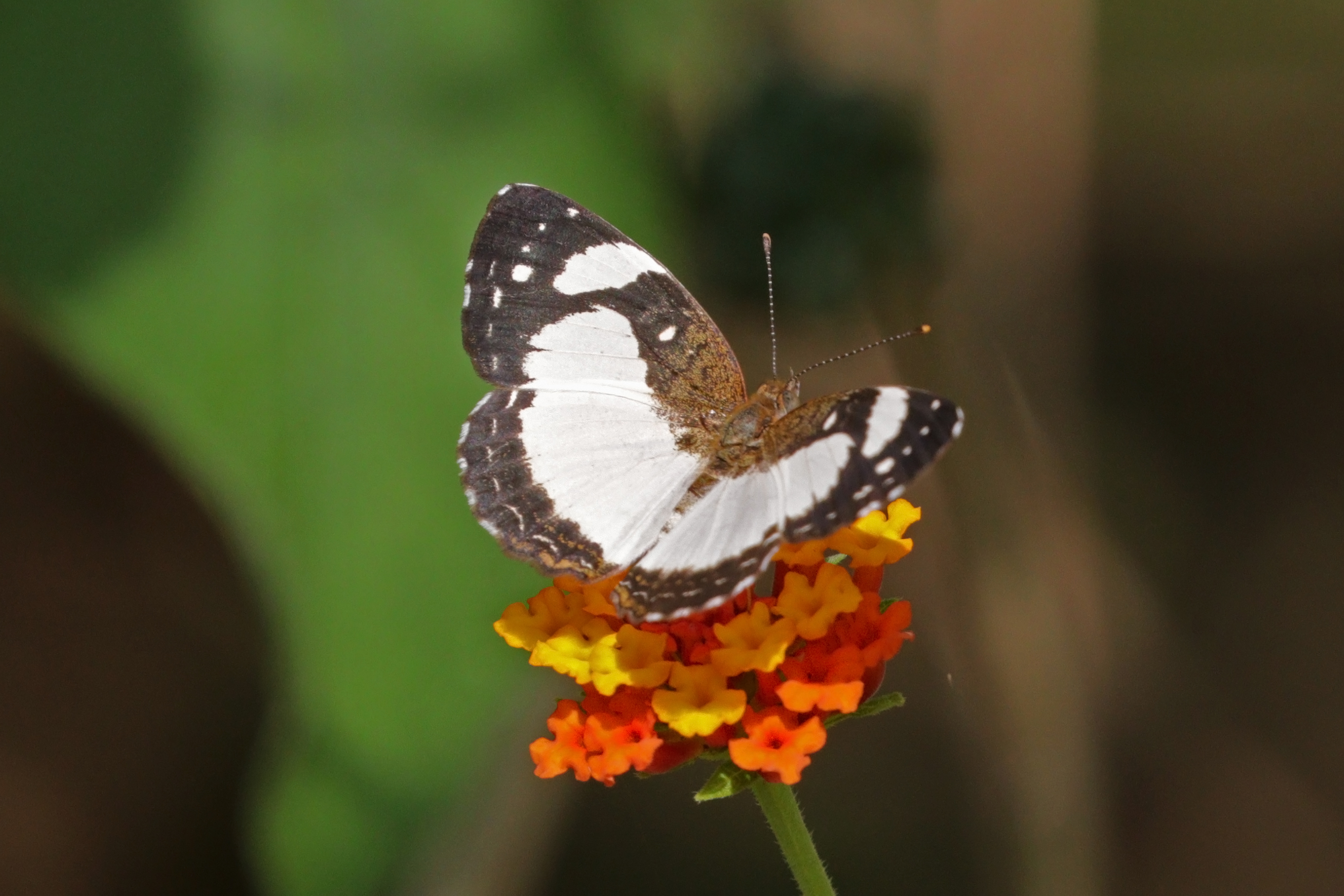
- Janatella leucodesma in Panama
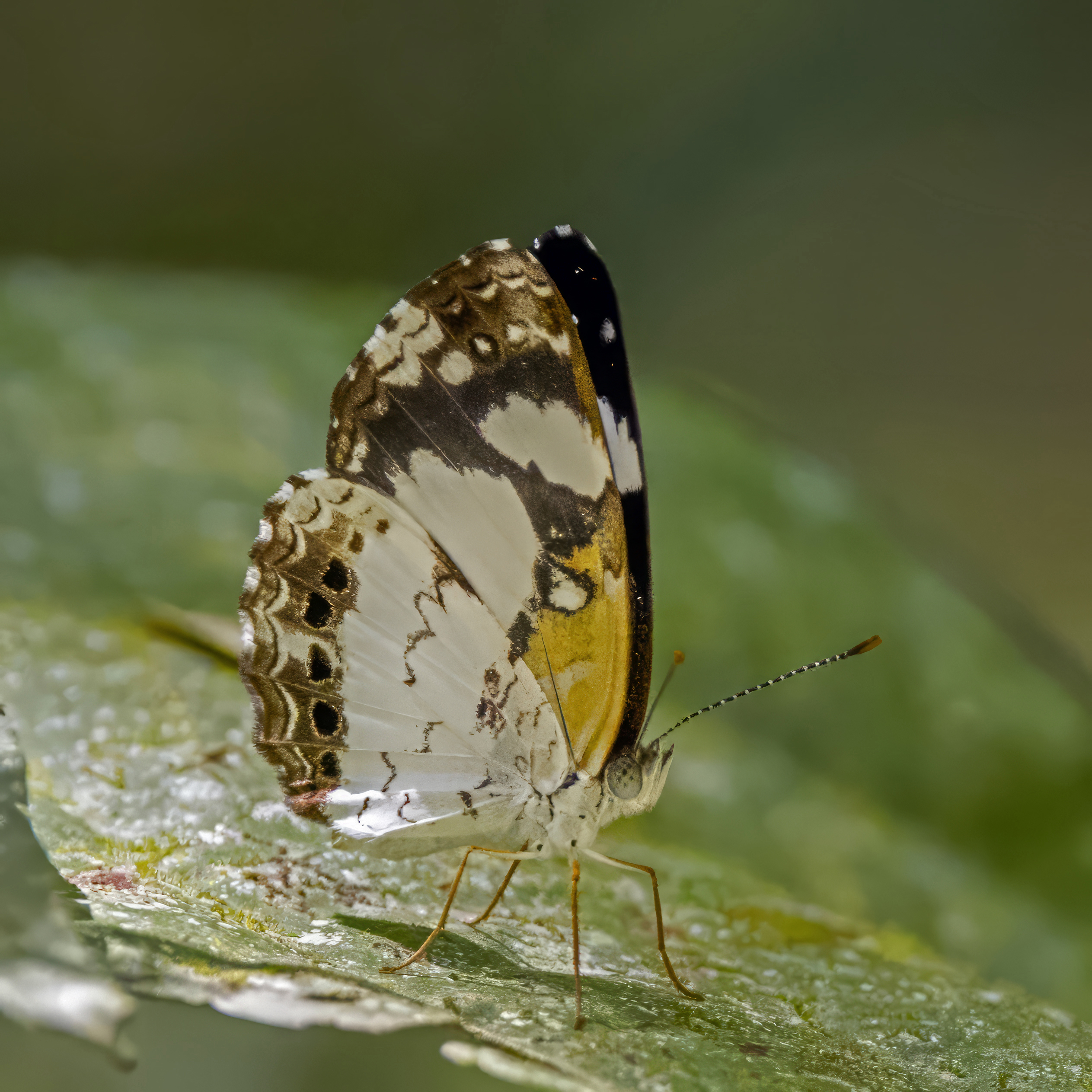
- Janatella leucodesma in Colombia

Scientific classification
- Kingdom: Animalia
- Phylum: Arthropoda
- Class: Insecta
- Order: Lepidoptera
- Family: Nymphalidae
- Subfamily: Nymphalinae
- Tribe: Melitaeini
- Subtribe: Phyciodina
- Genus: Janatella; Higgins, 1981

= Janatella =

Genus of butterflies

Janatella is a genus of butterflies which range from Central to South America in the family Nymphalidae. The species Janatella has trapezoidal wings that allow them to fly easily and fast. The flying performance of butterflies enabled the recreation of them into efficient aircraft using similar dimensions to that of butterfly wings.

== Species ==
Listed alphabetically:

- Janatella fellula (Schaus, 1902) (Ecuador, Colombia)
- Janatella hera (Cramer, [1779]) (French Guiana, Surinam)
- Janatella leucodesma (C. & R. Felder, 1861) (Trinidad, St. Vincent, Panama, Nicaragua, Colombia, Venezuela)
