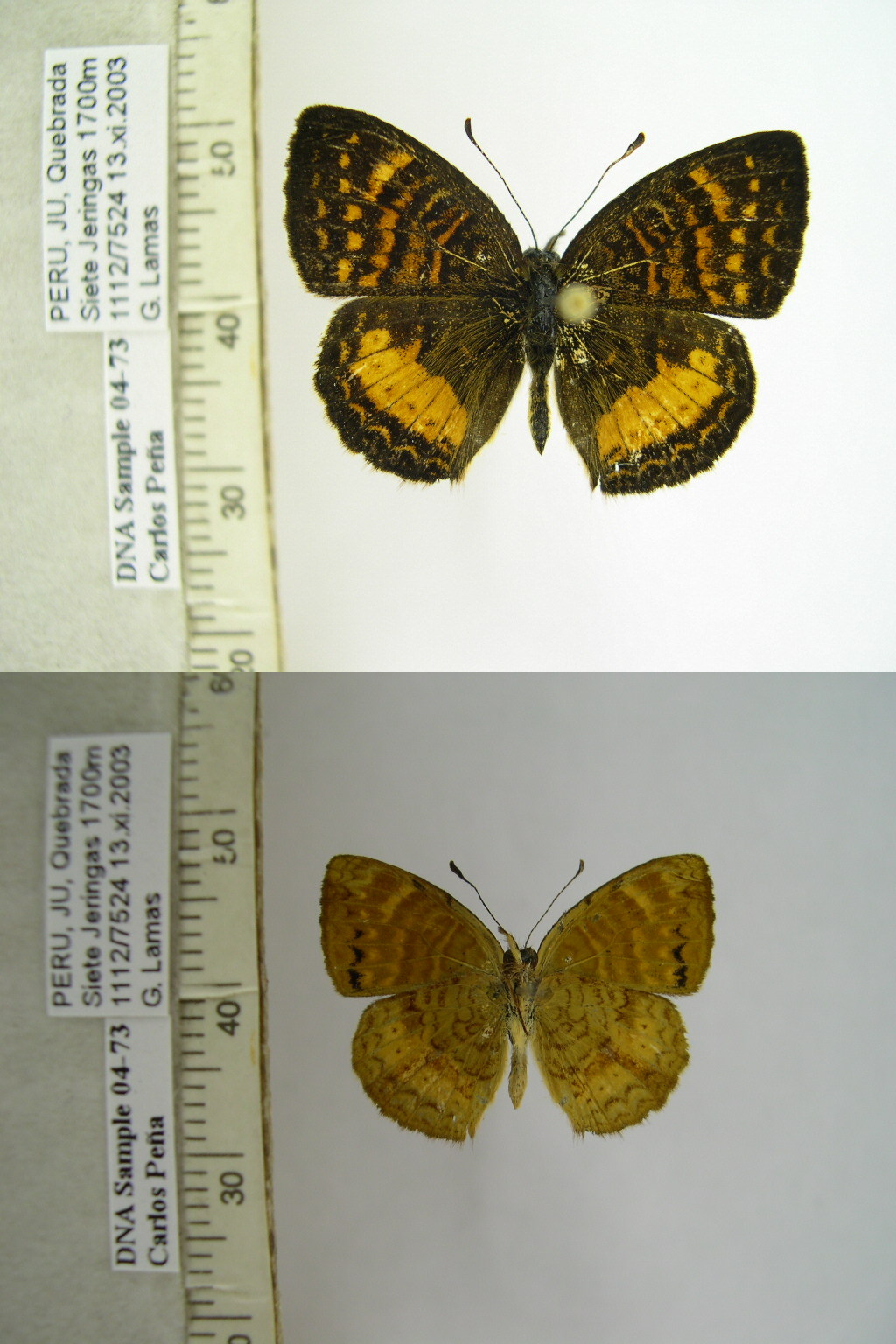

Scientific classification
- Kingdom: Animalia
- Phylum: Arthropoda
- Class: Insecta
- Order: Lepidoptera
- Family: Nymphalidae
- Subfamily: Nymphalinae
- Tribe: Melitaeini
- Subtribe: Chlosynina
- Genus: Higginsius; Hemming, 1964

Synonyms
- Fulvia Higgins, [1959]

= Higginsius =

Genus of butterflies

Higginsius is a genus of butterflies from north-eastern South America in the family Nymphalidae.

== Species ==
- Higginsius fasciata (Hopffer, 1874) – fasciata crescent (Peru, Ecuador, Colombia)
- Higginsius miriam (Dognin, 1888) (Ecuador, Colombia)
