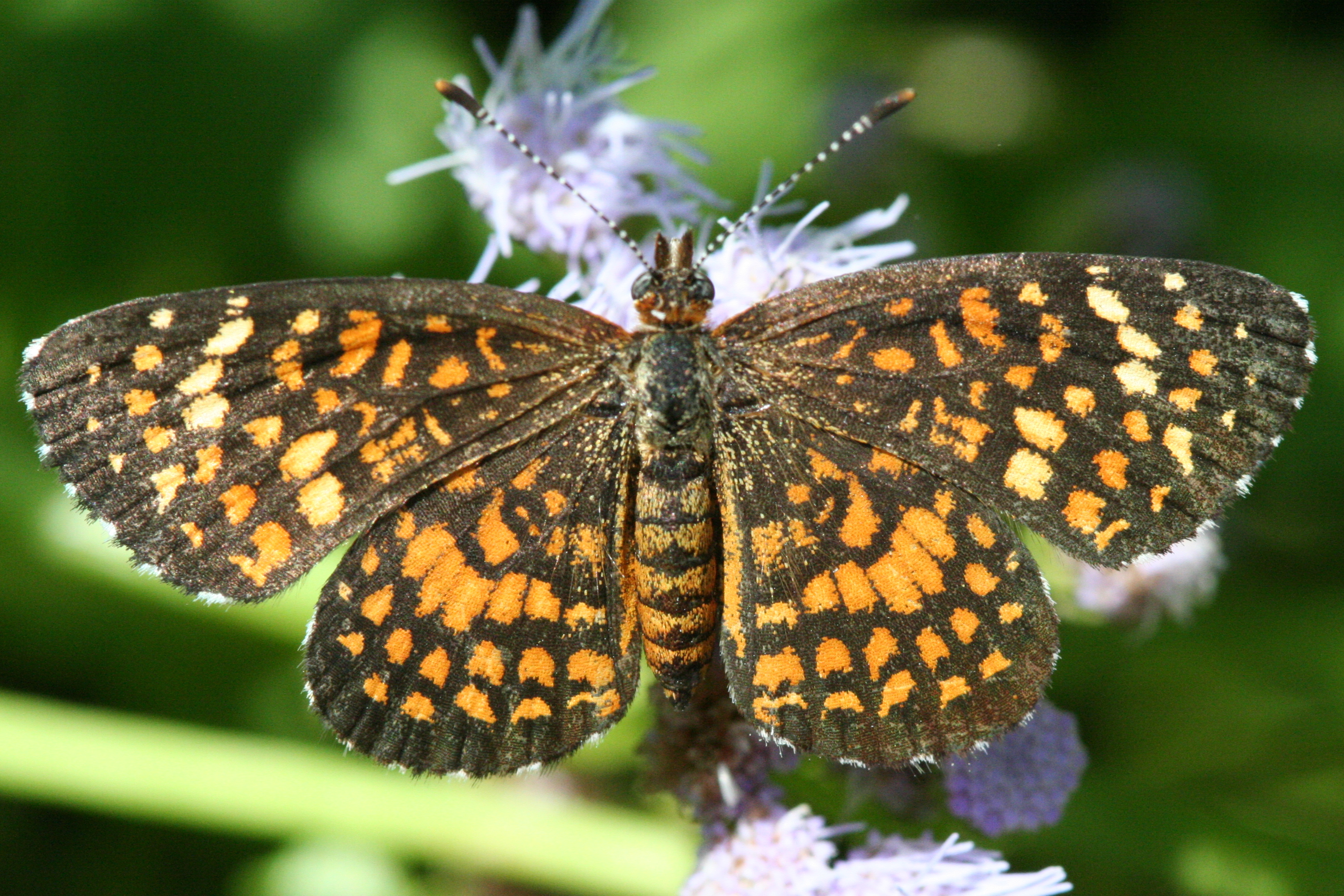
- Elada checkerspot (Texola elada), dorsal view

Scientific classification
- Domain: Eukaryota
- Kingdom: Animalia
- Phylum: Arthropoda
- Class: Insecta
- Order: Lepidoptera
- Family: Nymphalidae
- Tribe: Melitaeini
- Genus: Texola; Higgins, [1959]

= Texola (butterfly) =

Genus of butterflies

Texola is a genus of butterflies found from southern United States to Mexico in the family Nymphalidae.

== Species ==
Listed alphabetically:

- Texola anomalus (Godman & Salvin, 1897) – anomalous checkerspot (Mexico)
- Texola elada (Hewitson, 1868) – Elada checkerspot (Mexico, Texas, Arizona)
