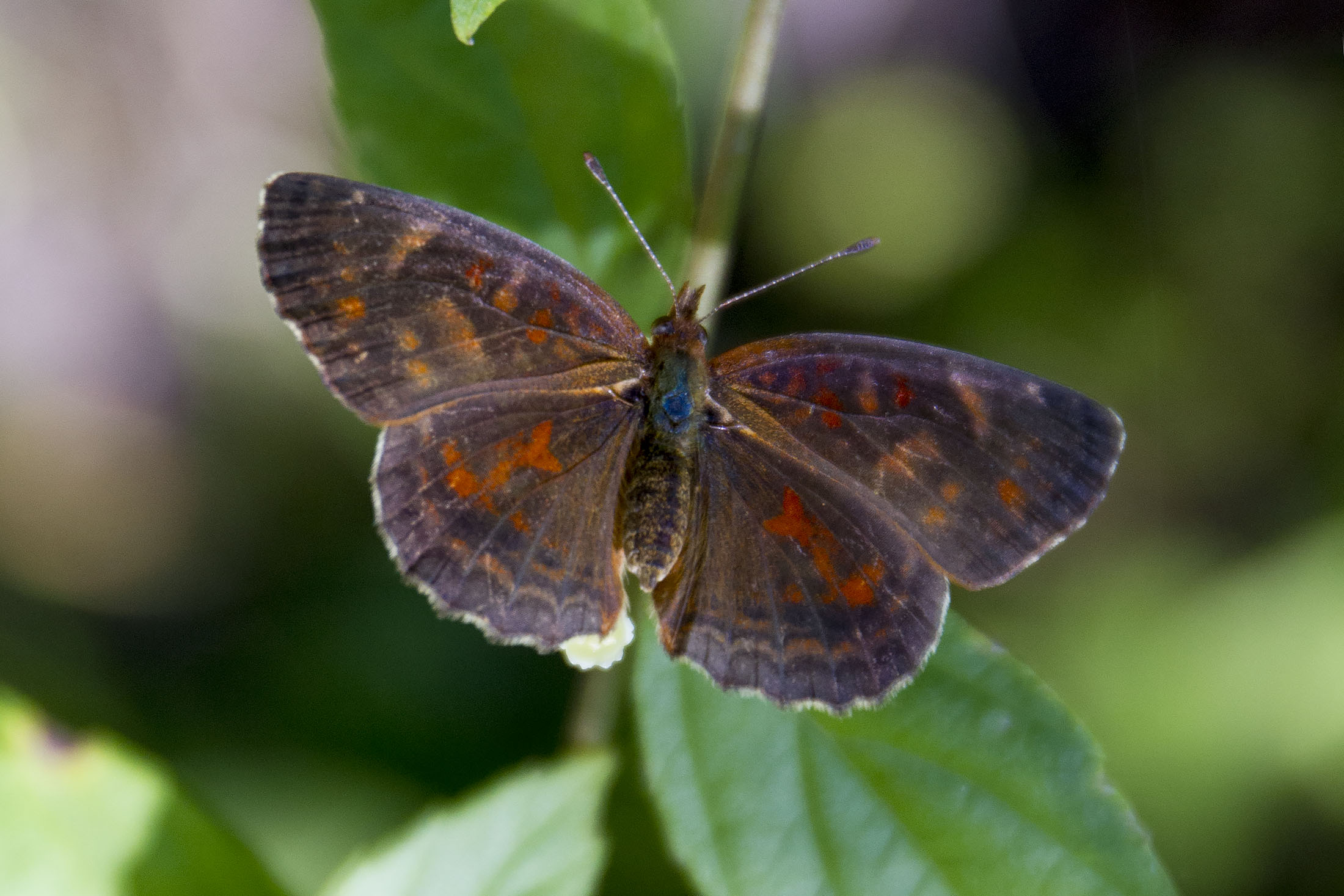
- Ortilia velica durnfordi in Soriano Department, Uruguay

Scientific classification
- Domain: Eukaryota
- Kingdom: Animalia
- Phylum: Arthropoda
- Class: Insecta
- Order: Lepidoptera
- Family: Nymphalidae
- Genus: Ortilia
- Species: O. velica

Binomial name
- Ortilia velica (Hewitson, 1864)

Synonyms
- Eresia velica Hewitson, [1864]

= Ortilia velica =

Species of butterfly

Ortilia velica, also known as the small brown, is a species of butterfly in the family Nymphalidae. It is found in Brazil, Uruguay, and Argentina. It is associated with the flowers of Wedelia silphioides.
