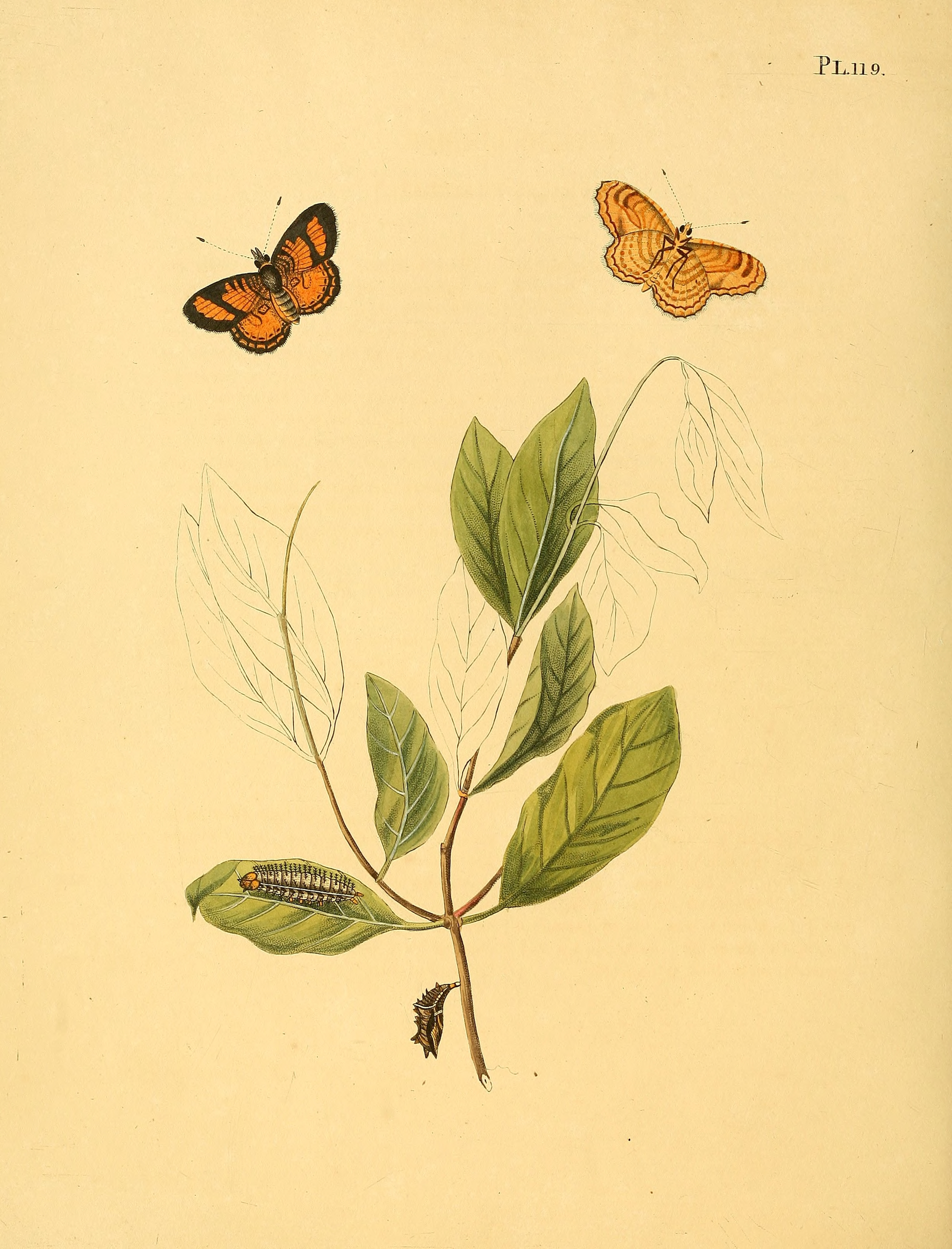

Scientific classification
- Kingdom: Animalia
- Phylum: Arthropoda
- Class: Insecta
- Order: Lepidoptera
- Family: Nymphalidae
- Genus: Ortilia
- Species: O. liriope

Binomial name
- Ortilia liriope (Cramer, 1775)

Synonyms
- Papilio liriope Cramer, [1775]

= Ortilia liriope =

Species of butterfly

Ortilia liriope, the Brazilian crescent, is a butterfly of the family Nymphalidae. It was described by Pieter Cramer in 1775. It is found in French Guiana, Guyana, Suriname and northern Brazil.

The larvae are gregarious and feed on Justicia species. They reach a length of about 19 mm.
