= Dagon (butterfly) =

Scientific classification
- Kingdom: Animalia
- Phylum: Arthropoda
- Clade: Pancrustacea
- Class: Insecta
- Order: Lepidoptera
- Family: Nymphalidae
- Subfamily: Nymphalinae
- Tribe: Melitaeini
- Subtribe: Phyciodina
- Genus: Dagon; Higgins, 1981

Genus of butterflies

Dagon is a genus of South American butterflies of the family Nymphalidae.

== Species ==
- Dagon pusilla Salvin, 1869
- Dagon catula Hopffer, 1874 – Catula crescent
- Dagon morena Röber, 1913
