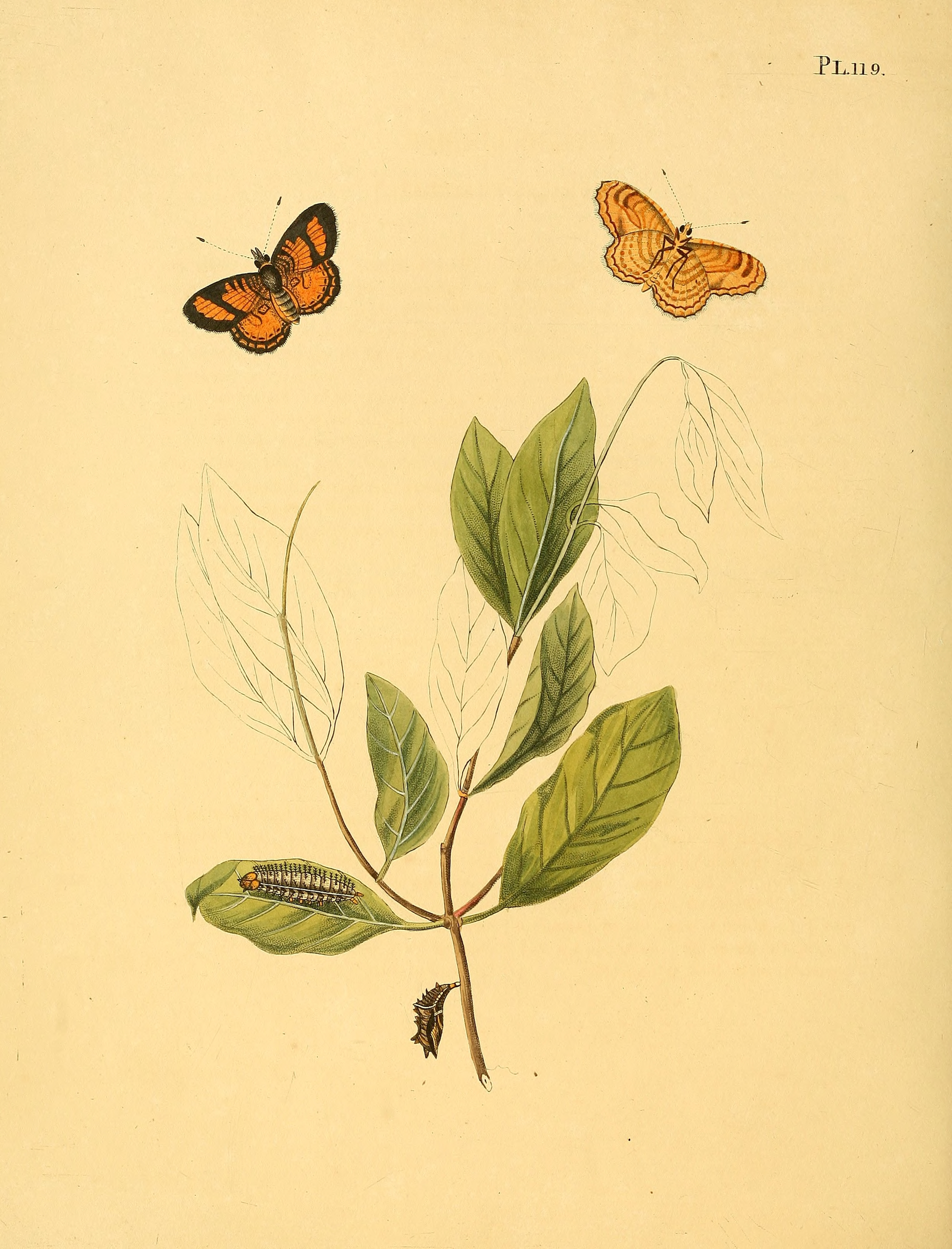

Scientific classification
- Domain: Eukaryota
- Kingdom: Animalia
- Phylum: Arthropoda
- Class: Insecta
- Order: Lepidoptera
- Family: Nymphalidae
- Tribe: Melitaeini
- Genus: Ortilia; Higgins, 1981

= Ortilia =

Genus of butterflies

Ortilia is a genus of butterflies of the family Nymphalidae found in South America.

== Species ==
Listed alphabetically:

- Ortilia dicoma (Hewitson, 1864) – Dicoma crescent
- Ortilia gentina Higgins, 1981 – Gentina crescent
- Ortilia ithra (Kirby, 1900) – Ithra crescent
- Ortilia liriope (Cramer, [1775])
- Ortilia orthia (Hewitson, 1864) – Orthia crescent
- Ortilia orticas (Schaus, 1902)
- Ortilia polinella (Hall, 1928)
- Ortilia sejona (Schaus, 1902)
- Ortilia velica (Hewitson, 1864) – Velica crescent
