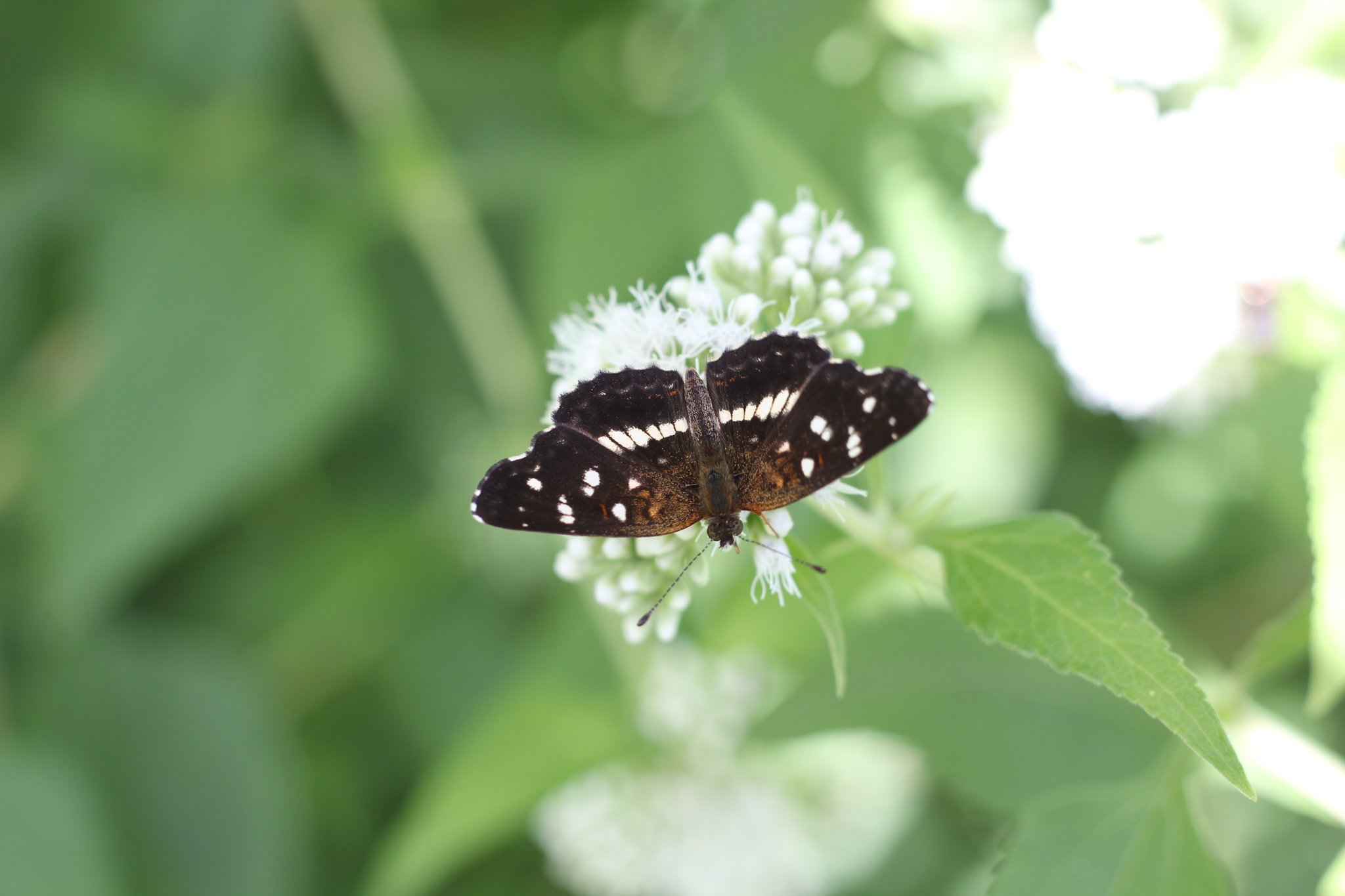

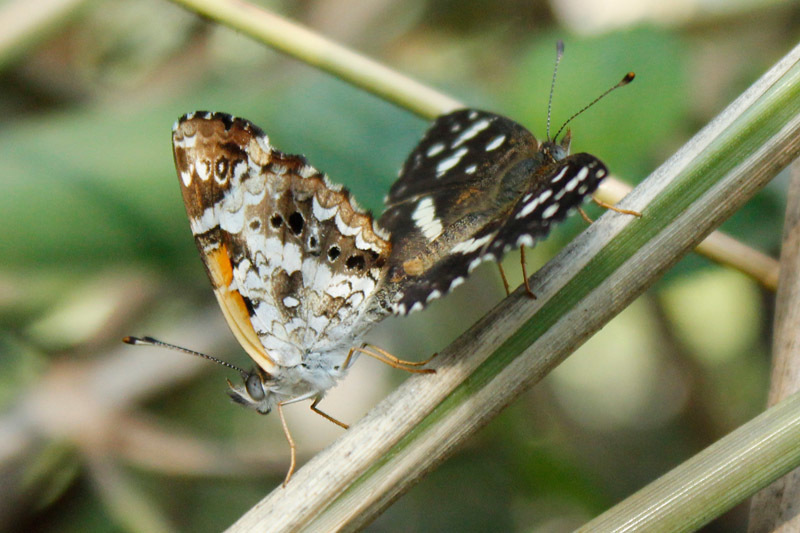

Scientific classification
- Domain: Eukaryota
- Kingdom: Animalia
- Phylum: Arthropoda
- Class: Insecta
- Order: Lepidoptera
- Family: Nymphalidae
- Genus: Ortilia
- Species: O. ithra

Binomial name
- Ortilia ithra (Kirby, 1900)

Synonyms
- Phyciodes ithra Kirby, [1900]; Neptis ithra Kirby, [1871]

= Ortilia ithra =

Species of butterfly

Ortilia ithra, or the Ithra crescent, is a species of butterfly in the family Nymphalidae. It is native to broadleaf forests in South America from Brazil to Argentina.
