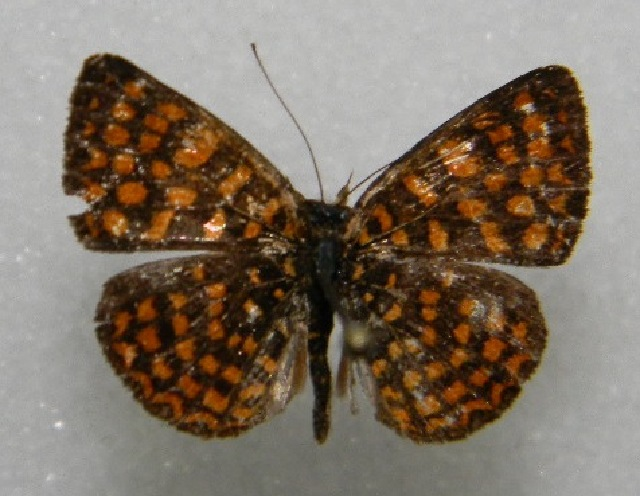

Scientific classification
- Domain: Eukaryota
- Kingdom: Animalia
- Phylum: Arthropoda
- Class: Insecta
- Order: Lepidoptera
- Family: Nymphalidae
- Tribe: Melitaeini
- Genus: Antillea; Higgins, [1959]

= Antillea =

Genus of butterflies

Antillea is a genus of butterflies from Central America in the family Nymphalidae.

== Species ==
- Antillea pelops (Drury, [1773])
- Antillea proclea (Doubleday, [1847])
