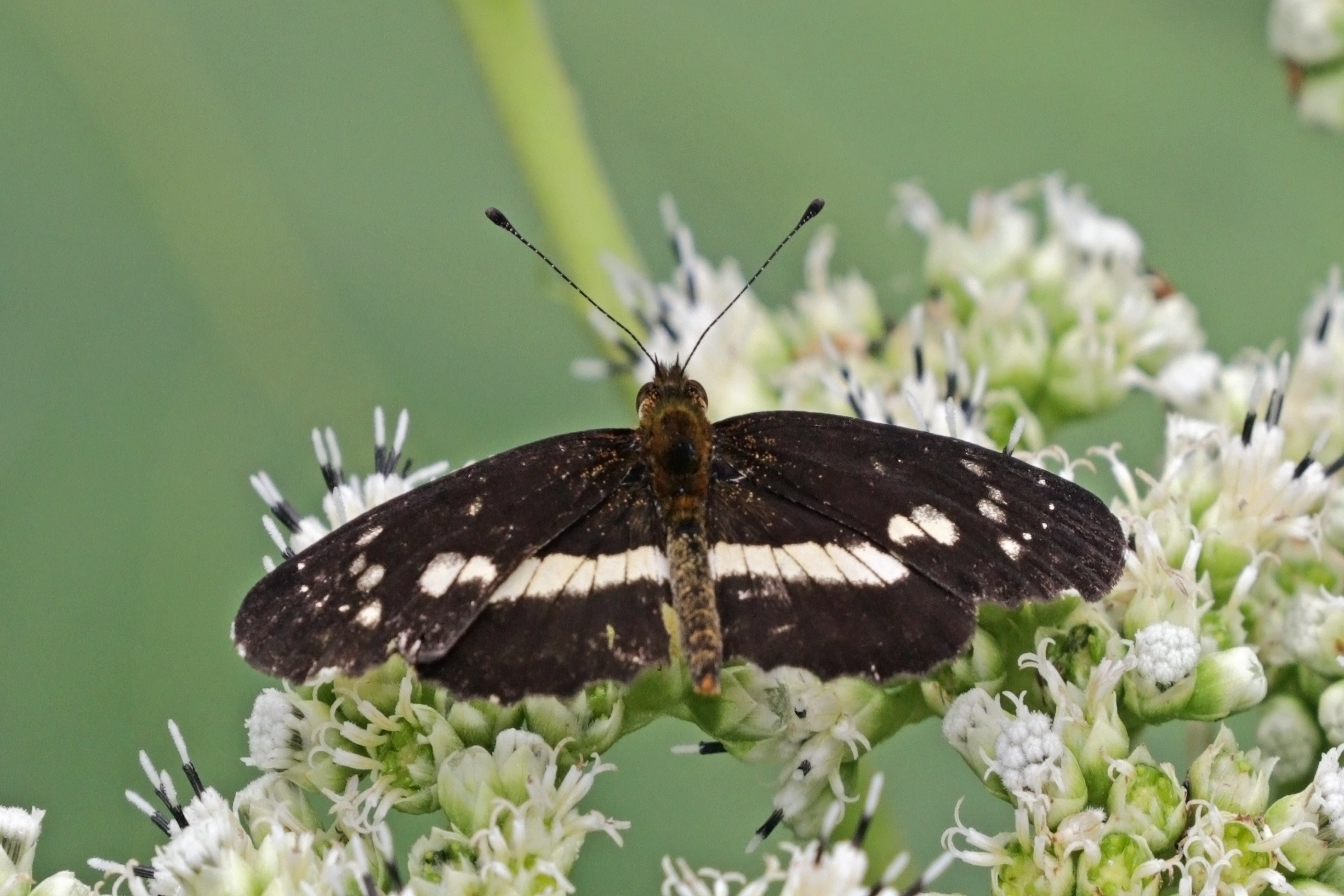
- White-dotted crescent Castilia ofella, Panama

Scientific classification
- Kingdom: Animalia
- Phylum: Arthropoda
- Class: Insecta
- Order: Lepidoptera
- Family: Nymphalidae
- Subfamily: Nymphalinae
- Tribe: Melitaeini
- Subtribe: Phyciodina
- Genus: Castilia; Higgins, 1981

= Castilia (butterfly) =

Genus of butterflies

Castilia is a genus of butterflies of the family Nymphalidae found from Mexico to South America.

== Species ==
Listed alphabetically:

- Castilia angusta (Hewitson, 1868) – angusta crescent
- Castilia castilla (C. & R. Felder, 1862)
- Castilia chiapaensis (Beutelspacher, 1990) – Chiapas crescent
- Castilia chinantlensis (de la Maza, 1978) – Chinantlan crescent, pie-slice crescent
- Castilia eranites (Hewitson, 1857) – smudged crescent
- Castilia fulgora (Godman & Salvin, 1878)
- Castilia griseobasalis (Röber, 1913) – gray-based crescent
- Castilia guaya (Hall, 1929)
- Castilia myia (Hewitson, 1864) – Mayan crescent
- Castilia neria (Hewitson, 1869)
- Castilia ofella (Hewitson, 1864) – white-dotted crescent
- Castilia perilla (Hewitson, 1852)
- Castilia nortbrundii (Weeks, 1901)
