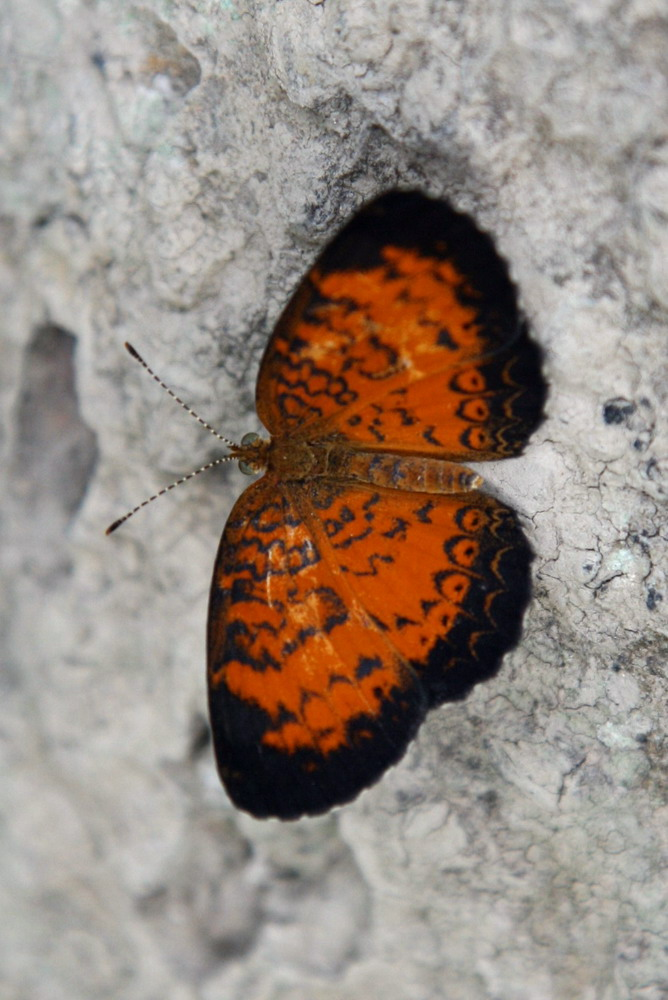

Scientific classification
- Kingdom: Animalia
- Phylum: Arthropoda
- Class: Insecta
- Order: Lepidoptera
- Family: Nymphalidae
- Subfamily: Nymphalinae
- Tribe: Melitaeini
- Subtribe: Phyciodina
- Genus: Mazia; Higgins, 1981
- Species: M. amazonica

Binomial name
- Mazia amazonica (Bates, 1864)

Synonyms
- Melitaea amazonica

= Mazia =

Genus of butterflies

Mazia is a monotypic genus of butterflies in the family Nymphalidae that contains the species Mazia amazonica found in South America.

== Subspecies ==
- Mazia amazonica amazonica (Bates, 1864) (Brazil)
- Mazia amazonica cocha Lamas, 1905 (Ecuador, Peru)
- Mazia amazonica tambopata Lamas, 1995 (Peru)
