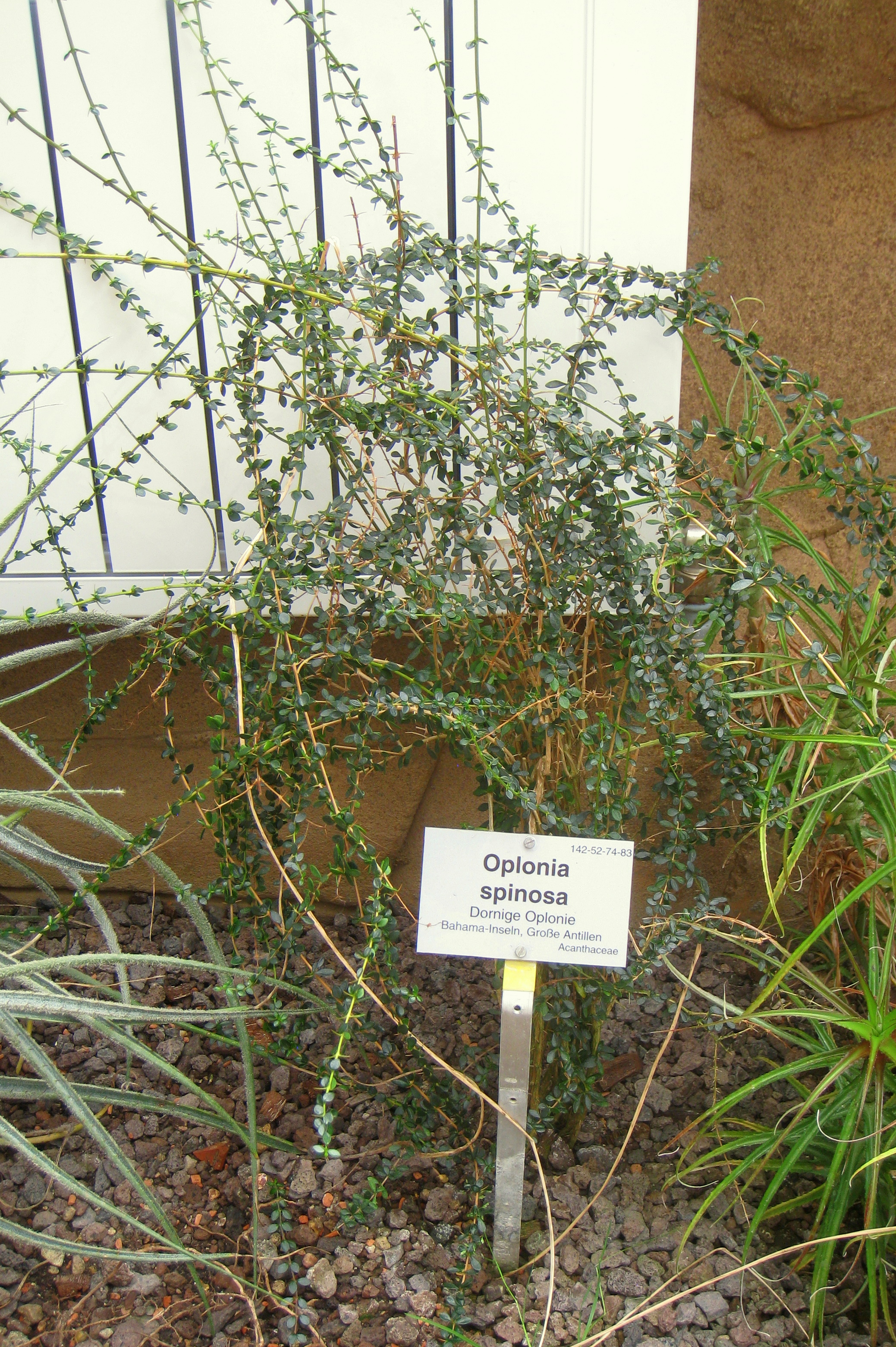
- Oplonia spinosa

Scientific classification
- Kingdom: Plantae
- Clade: Tracheophytes
- Clade: Angiosperms
- Clade: Eudicots
- Clade: Asterids
- Order: Lamiales
- Family: Acanthaceae
- Subfamily: Acanthoideae
- Tribe: Justicieae
- Genus: Oplonia; Raf. (1838)

Synonyms
- Anthacanthus Nees (1847); Crateola Raf. (1838); Forsythiopsis Baker (1883); Hesperanthemum Kuntze (1891)

= Oplonia =

Genus of flowering plants

Oplonia is a genus of plants in the family Acanthaceae. It includes 21 species native to western South America (Peru, Bolivia, and northwestern Argentina), the Caribbean, and Madagascar.

== Species ==
21 species are accepted.

- Oplonia acicularis (Sw.) Stearn
- Oplonia acuminata Stearn
- Oplonia acunae Borhidi
- Oplonia armata (Sw.) Stearn
- Oplonia cubensis Borhidi
- Oplonia grandiflora (Lindau) Stearn
- Oplonia hutchisonii Wassh.
- Oplonia jamaicensis (Lindau) Stearn
- Oplonia jujuyensis Wassh. & C.Ezcurra
- Oplonia linifolia (Benoist) Stearn
- Oplonia microphylla (Lam.) Stearn
- Oplonia minor (Benoist) Stearn
- Oplonia moana Borhidi
- Oplonia multigemma Borhidi
- Oplonia nannophylla (Urb.) Stearn
- Oplonia polyece (Stearn) Borhidi
- Oplonia puberula Stearn
- Oplonia purpurascens (Griseb.) Stearn
- Oplonia spinosa (Jacq.) Raf.
- Oplonia tetrasticha (C.Wright ex Griseb.) Stearn
- Oplonia vincoides (Lam.) Stearn
