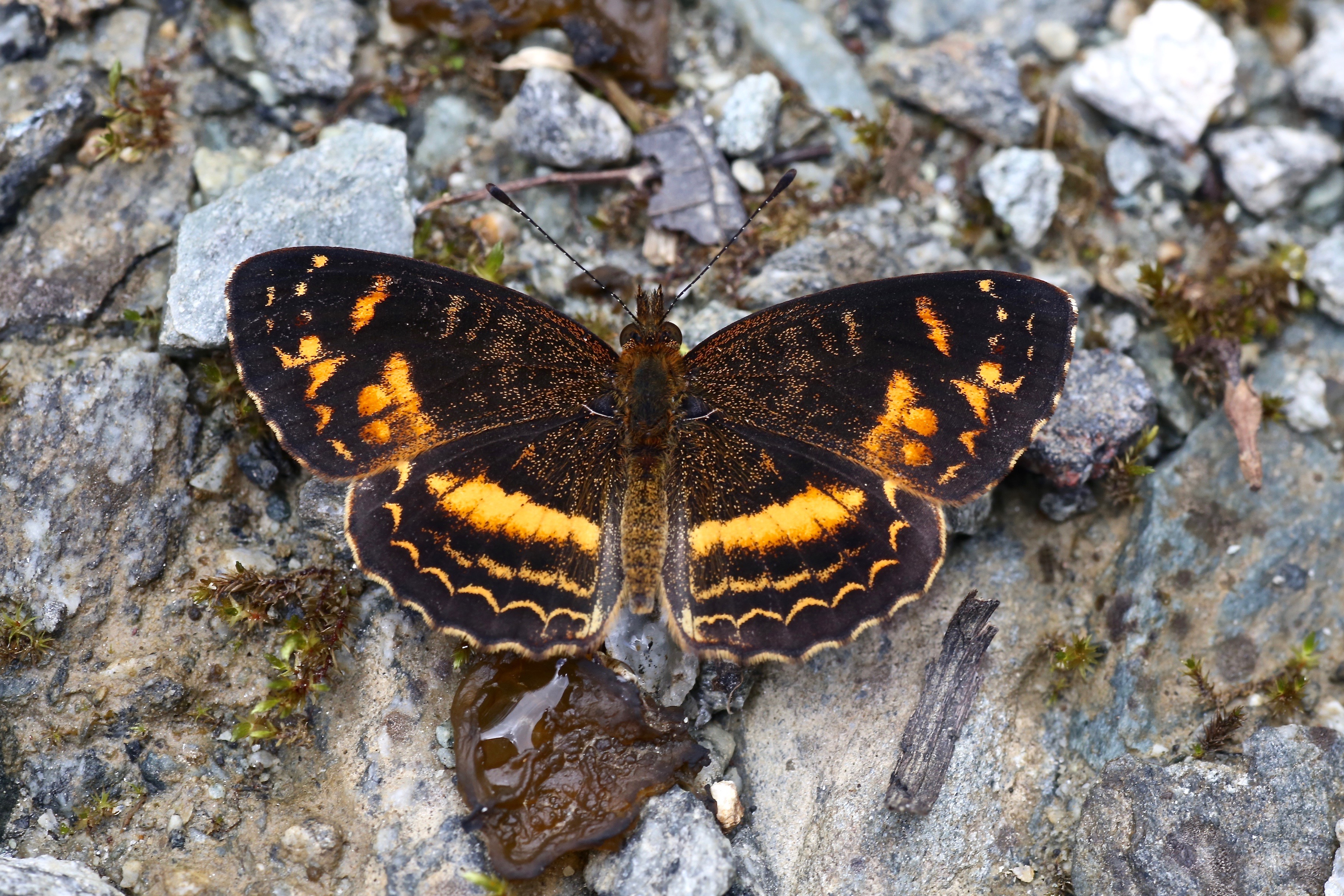
- Telenassa berenice

Scientific classification
- Kingdom: Animalia
- Phylum: Arthropoda
- Class: Insecta
- Order: Lepidoptera
- Family: Nymphalidae
- Subfamily: Nymphalinae
- Tribe: Melitaeini
- Subtribe: Phyciodina
- Genus: Telenassa; Higgins, 1981

= Telenassa =

Genus of butterflies

Telenassa is a genus of butterflies of the family Nymphalidae found in South America.

== Species ==
Listed alphabetically:

- Telenassa abas (Hewitson, 1864)
- Telenassa berenice (C. & R. Felder, 1862) – narrow-banded crescent
- Telenassa delphia (C. & R. Felder, 1861) – Delphia crescent
- Telenassa fontus (Hall, 1928) – Fontus crescent
- Telenassa jana (C. & R. Felder, [1867]) – Jana crescent
- Telenassa notus (Hall, 1917) – Notus crescent
- Telenassa sepultus (Hall, 1928)
- Telenassa teletusa (Godart, [1824]) – Burchell's crescent
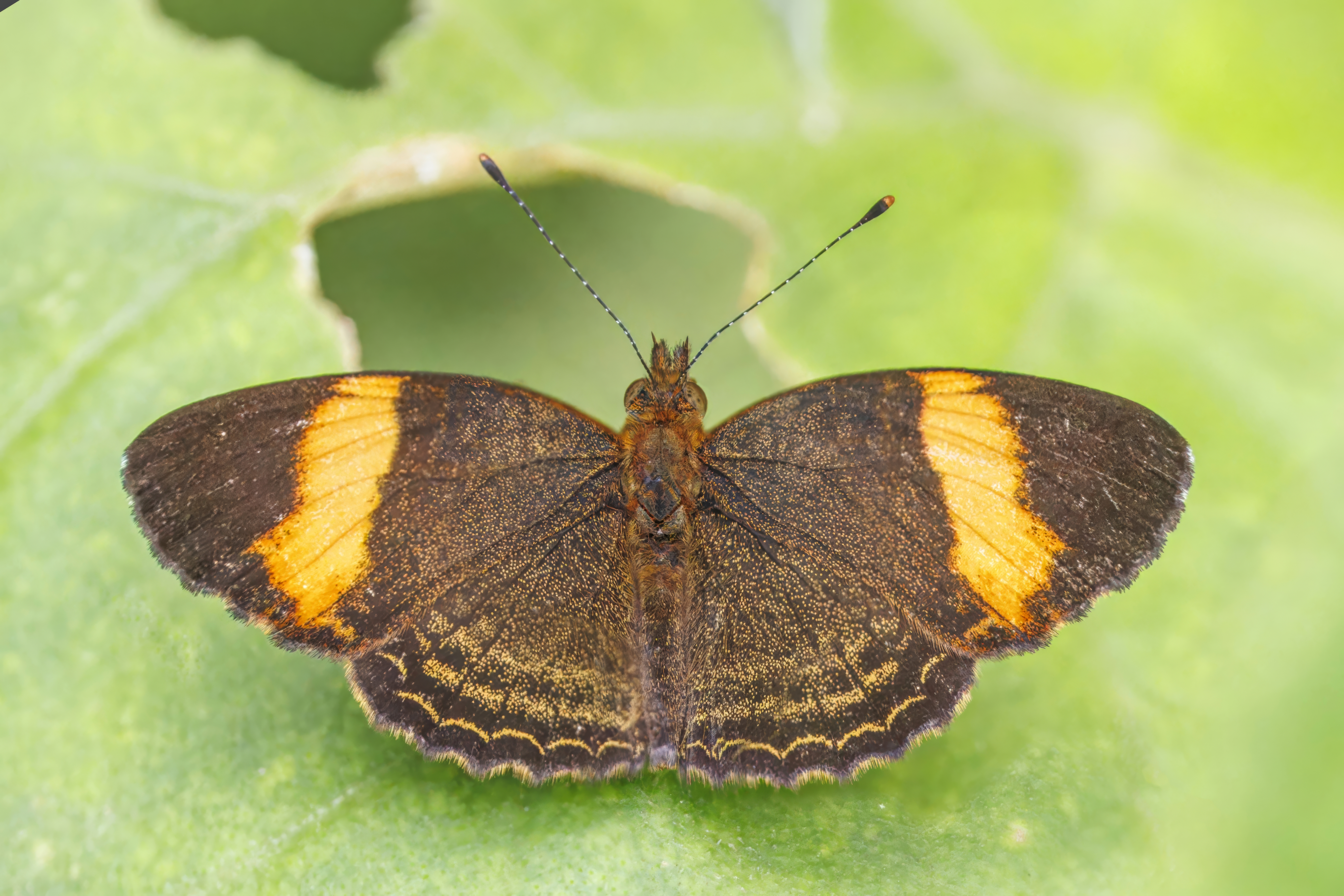
Telenassa jana, Ecuador

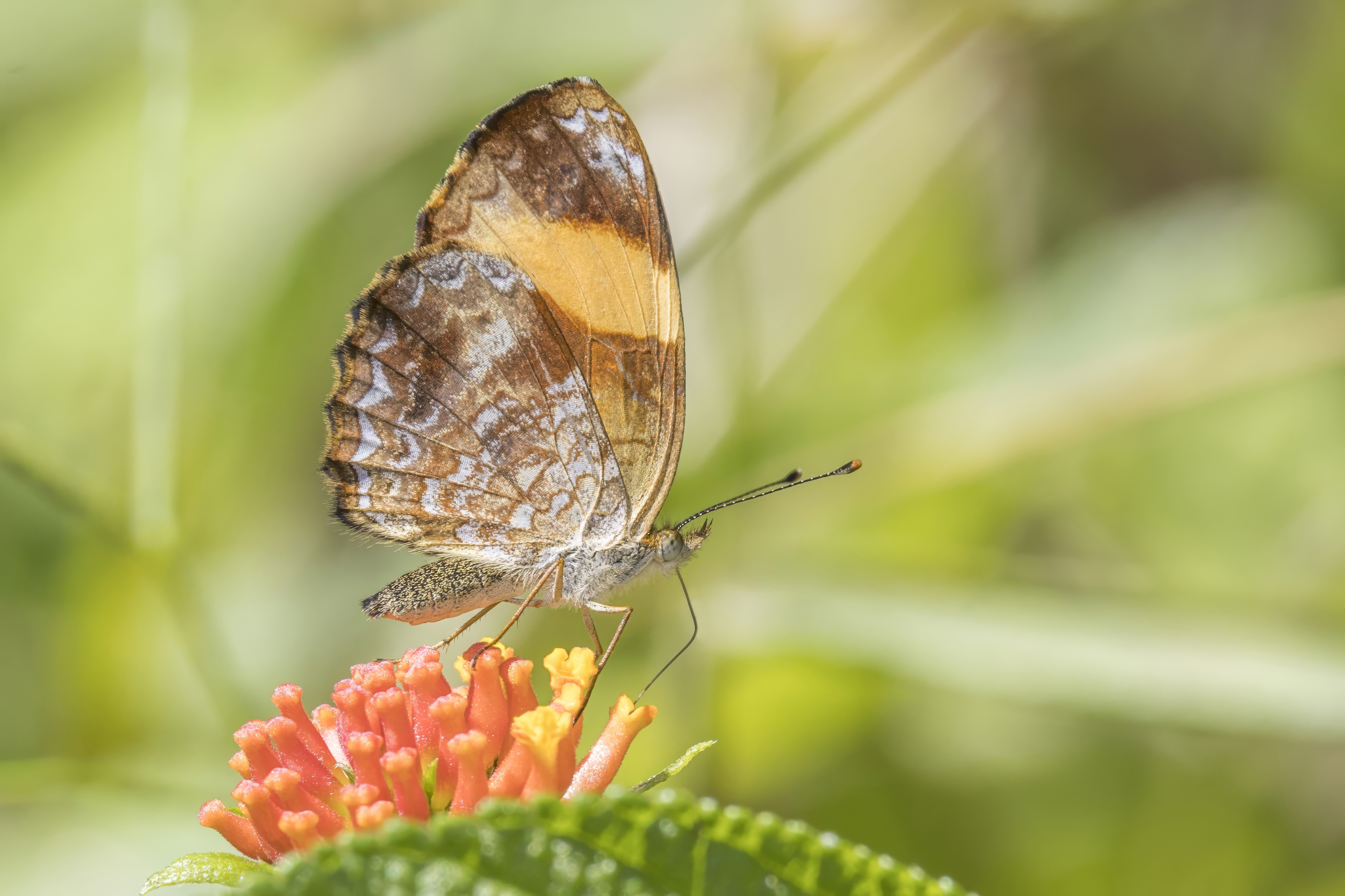
Telenassa jana, Ecuador
