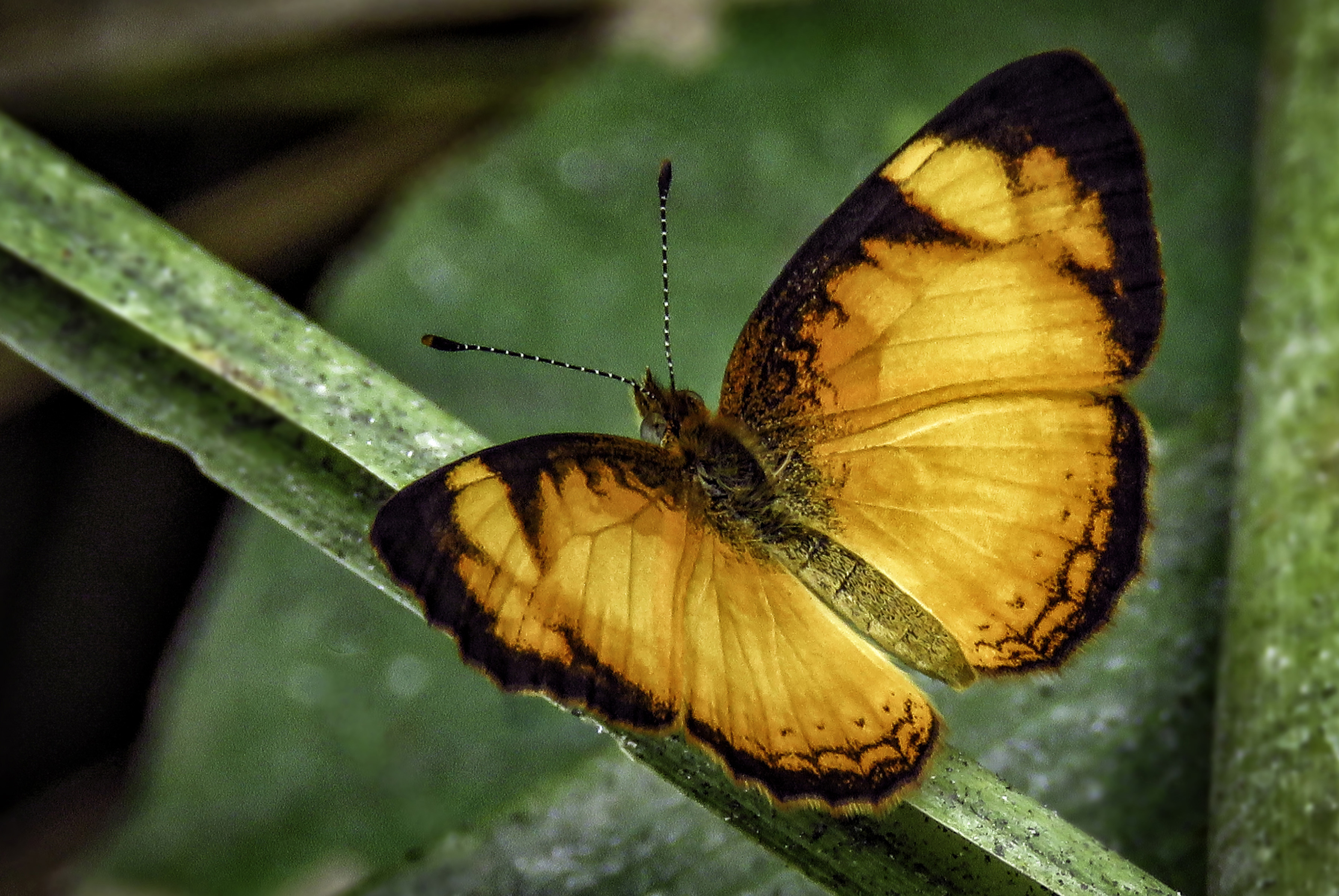
- possibly T. anieta in Minas Gerais, Brazil

Scientific classification
- Kingdom: Animalia
- Phylum: Arthropoda
- Class: Insecta
- Order: Lepidoptera
- Family: Nymphalidae
- Genus: Tegosa; Higgins, 1981

= Tegosa =

Genus of butterflies

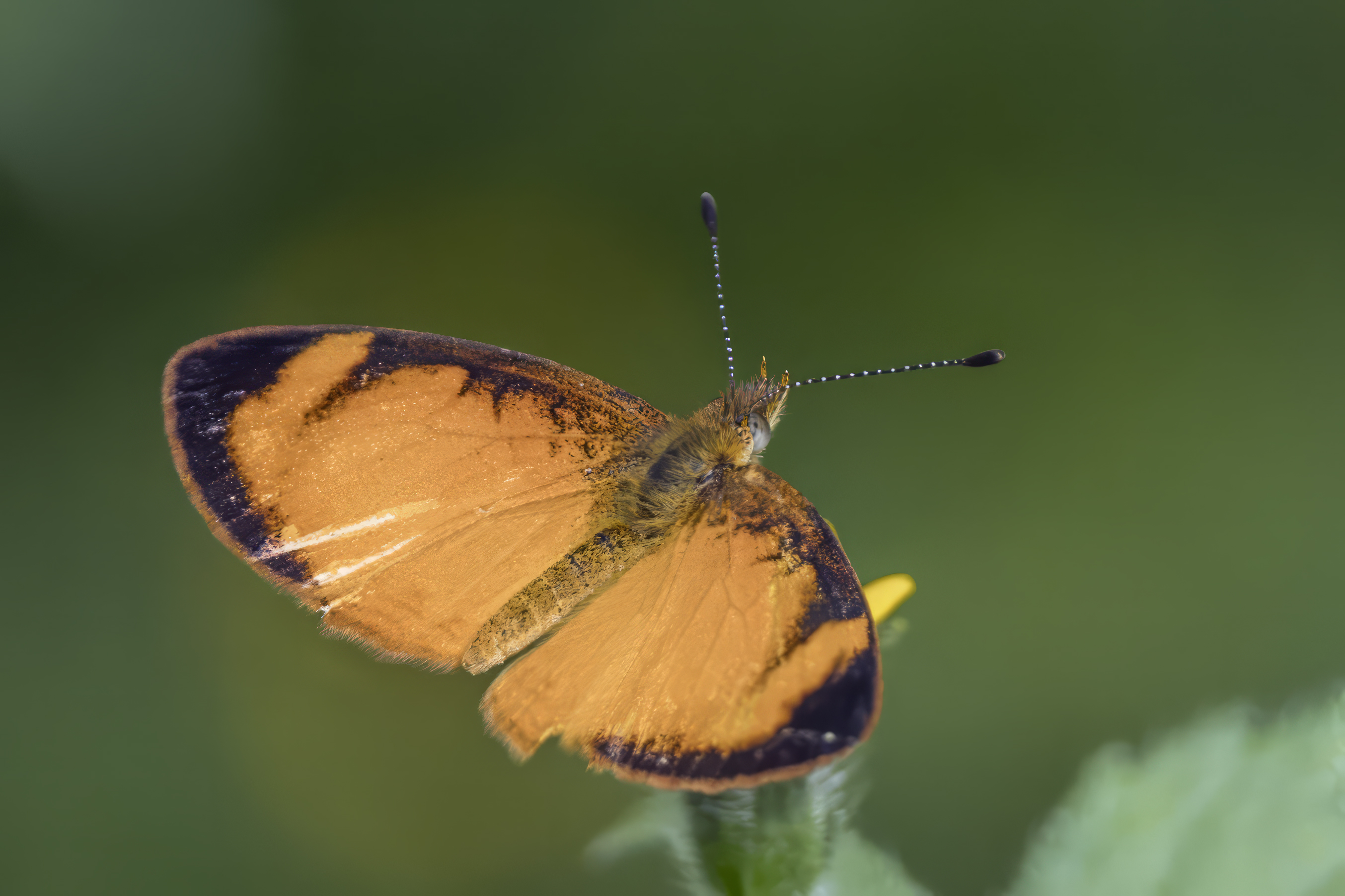
T. claudina, Colombia

Tegosa is a Neotropical genus of butterflies from Mexico to South America in the family Nymphalidae.

== Species ==
Listed alphabetically:

- Tegosa anieta (Hewitson, 1864) – black-bordered tegosa
- Tegosa claudina (Eschscholtz, 1821) – Claudina's tegosa, apricot crescent
- Tegosa etia (Hewitson, 1868) – rusty crescent
- Tegosa flavida (Hewitson, 1868)
- Tegosa fragilis (Bates, 1864)
- Tegosa guatemalena (Bates, 1864) – Guatemalan tegosa
- Tegosa infrequens Higgins, 1981
- Tegosa nazaria (C. & R. Felder, [1867])
- Tegosa nigrella (Bates, 1866) – dark tegosa
- Tegosa orobia (Hewitson, 1864)
- Tegosa pastazena (Bates, 1864) – Pastazena crescent
- Tegosa selene (Röber, 1913) – Selene crescent
- Tegosa serpia Higgins, 1981 – serpia crescent
- Tegosa tissoides (Hall, 1928) – tissoides crescent
