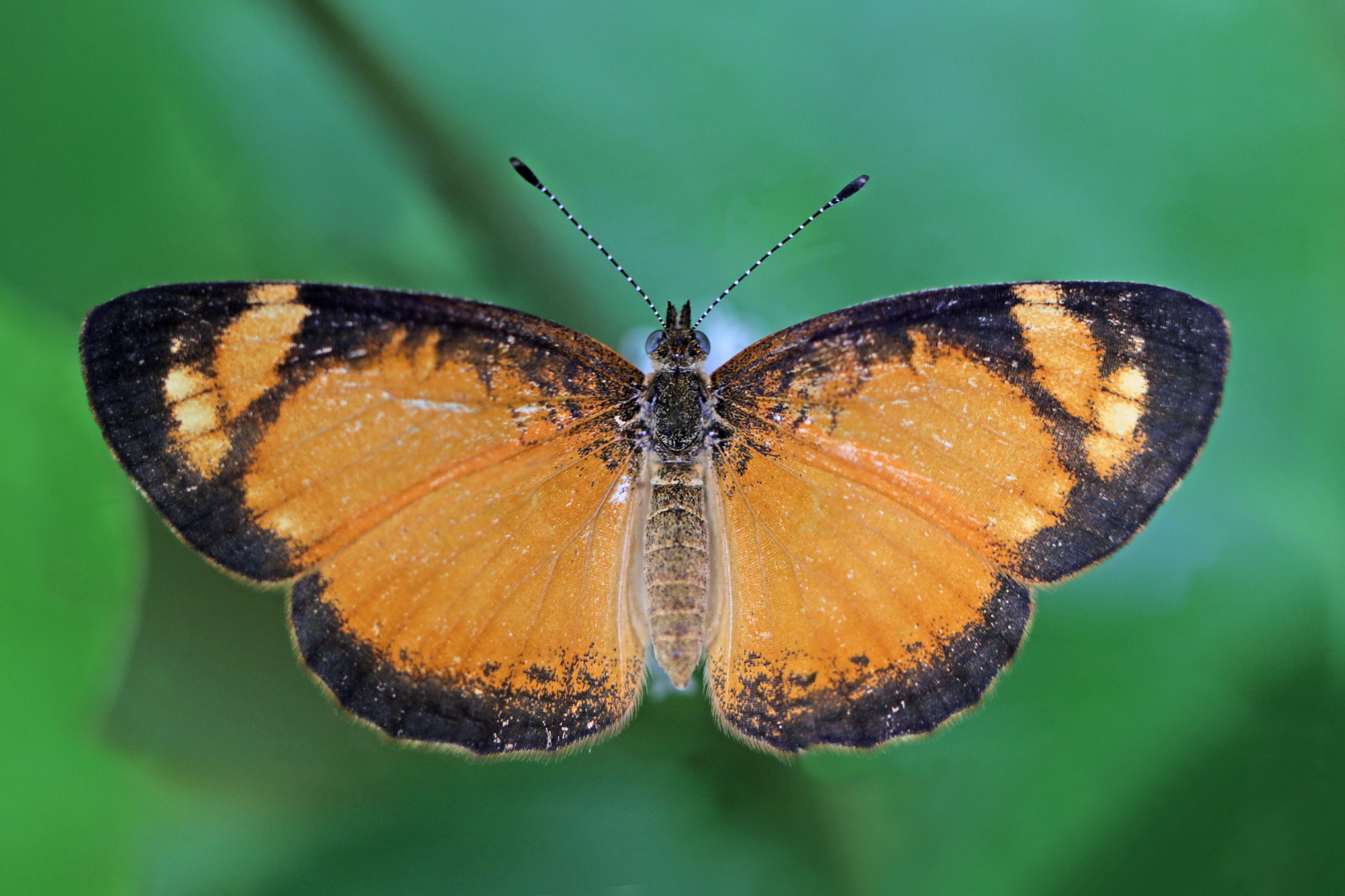

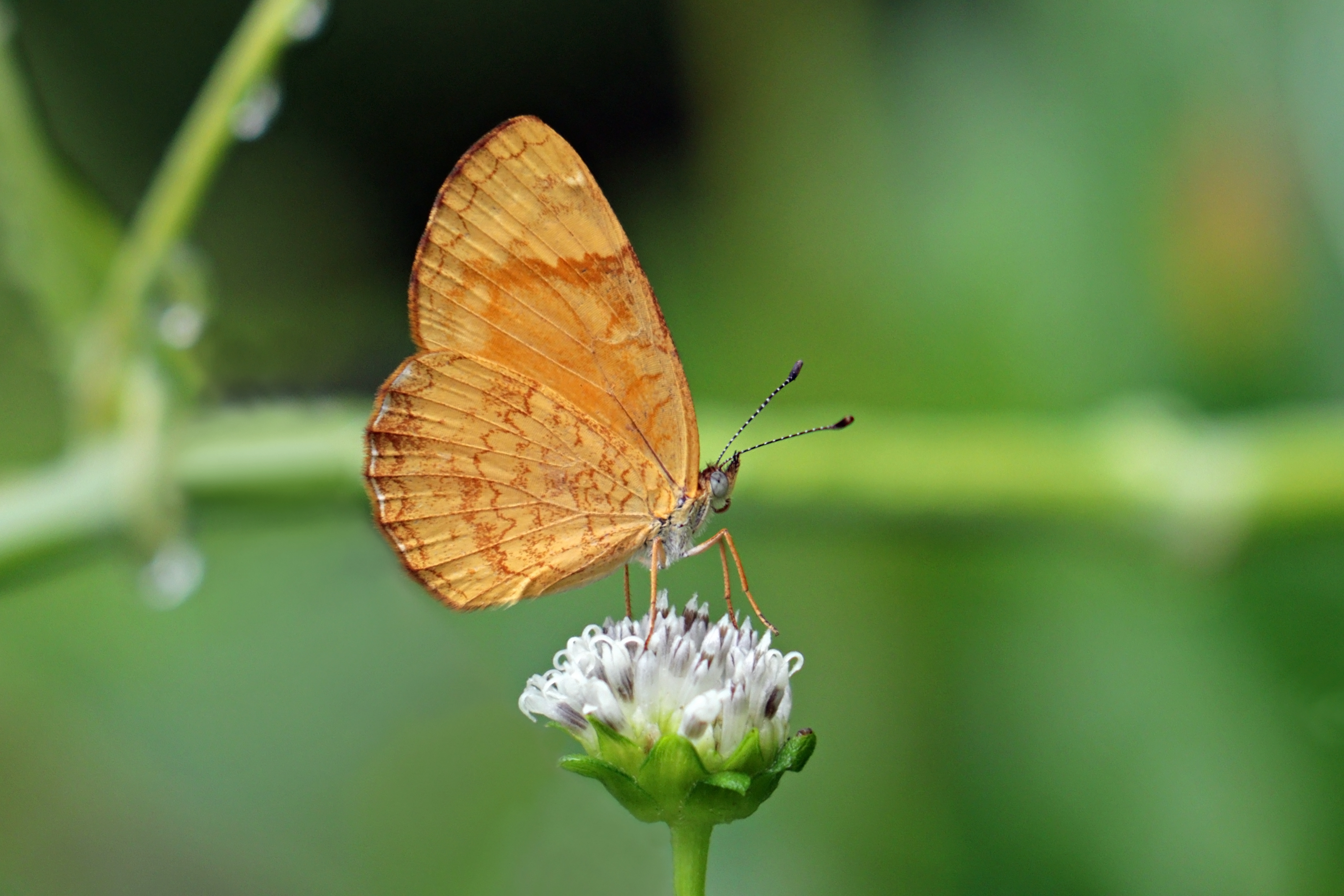
- both T. a. anieta, Panama

Scientific classification
- Kingdom: Animalia
- Phylum: Arthropoda
- Class: Insecta
- Order: Lepidoptera
- Family: Nymphalidae
- Genus: Tegosa
- Species: T. anieta

Binomial name
- Tegosa anieta (Hewitson, 1864)

Subspecies
- Four, see text

Synonyms
- Eresia anieta Hewitson, 1864; Phyciodes cluvia Godman & Salvin, [1882]; Phyciodes liriope lirina Röber, 1913

= Tegosa anieta =

Species of butterfly

Tegosa anieta, the black-bordered tegosa, is a species of butterfly in the genus Tegosa found from southern Mexico to South America.

== Subspecies ==
Listed alphabetically:

- Tegosa anieta anieta (Hewitson, 1864)
- Tegosa anieta cluvia (Godman & Salvin, [1882])
- Tegosa anieta lirina (Röber, 1913)
- Tegosa anieta luka Higgins, 1981
