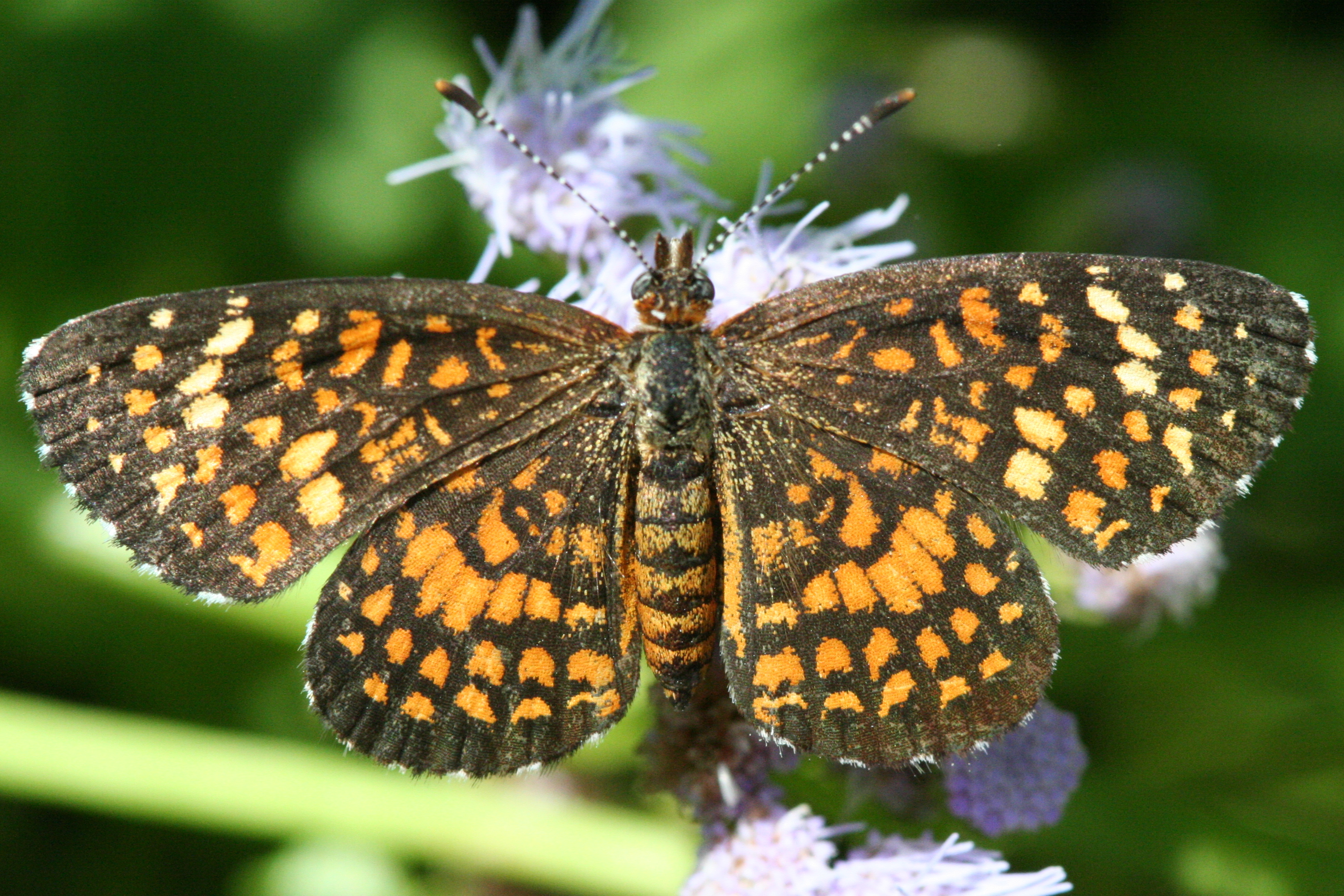

Scientific classification
- Kingdom: Animalia
- Phylum: Arthropoda
- Class: Insecta
- Order: Lepidoptera
- Family: Nymphalidae
- Genus: Texola
- Species: T. elada

Binomial name
- Texola elada (Hewitson, [1868])

Synonyms
- Microtia elada; Eresia elada Hewitson, [1868]; Phyciodes elada; Melitaea callina Boisduval, 1869; Eresia socia R. Felder, 1869; Phyciodes hepburni Godman, [1901]; Melitaea ulrica Edwards, 1877; Melitaea imitata Strecker, [1878]; Phyciodes imitata; Cinclidia ulrica; Melitaea perse Edwards, 1882; Cinclidia perse

= Texola elada =

Elada checkerspot

Species of butterfly

Texola elada, the Elada checkerspot, is a species of butterfly in the brush-footed butterfly family, Nymphalidae. It is found from southern Mexico north to central Texas and central Arizona in the United States.

The wingspan is 22–32 mm (0.87–1.26 in). Adults are on wing from April to October. There are several generations per year.

The larvae feed on Siphonoglossa pilosella in Texas. They have been recorded feeding on various yellow Asteraceae species in Mexico. Adults feed on flower nectar.

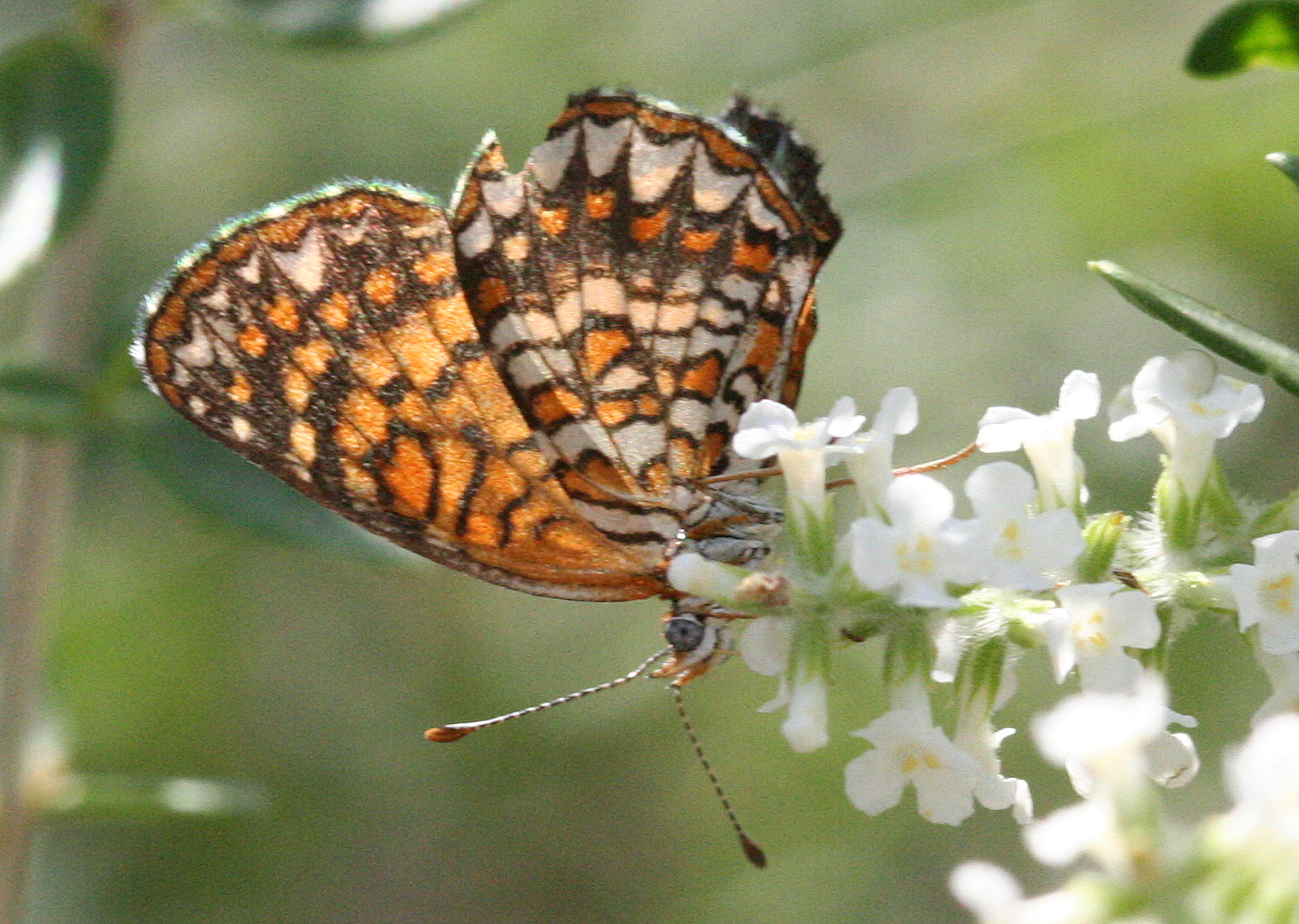
Ventral view

== Subspecies ==
- Texola elada elada (Mexico)
- Texola elada ulrica (Texas)
- Texola elada perse (Arizona)
