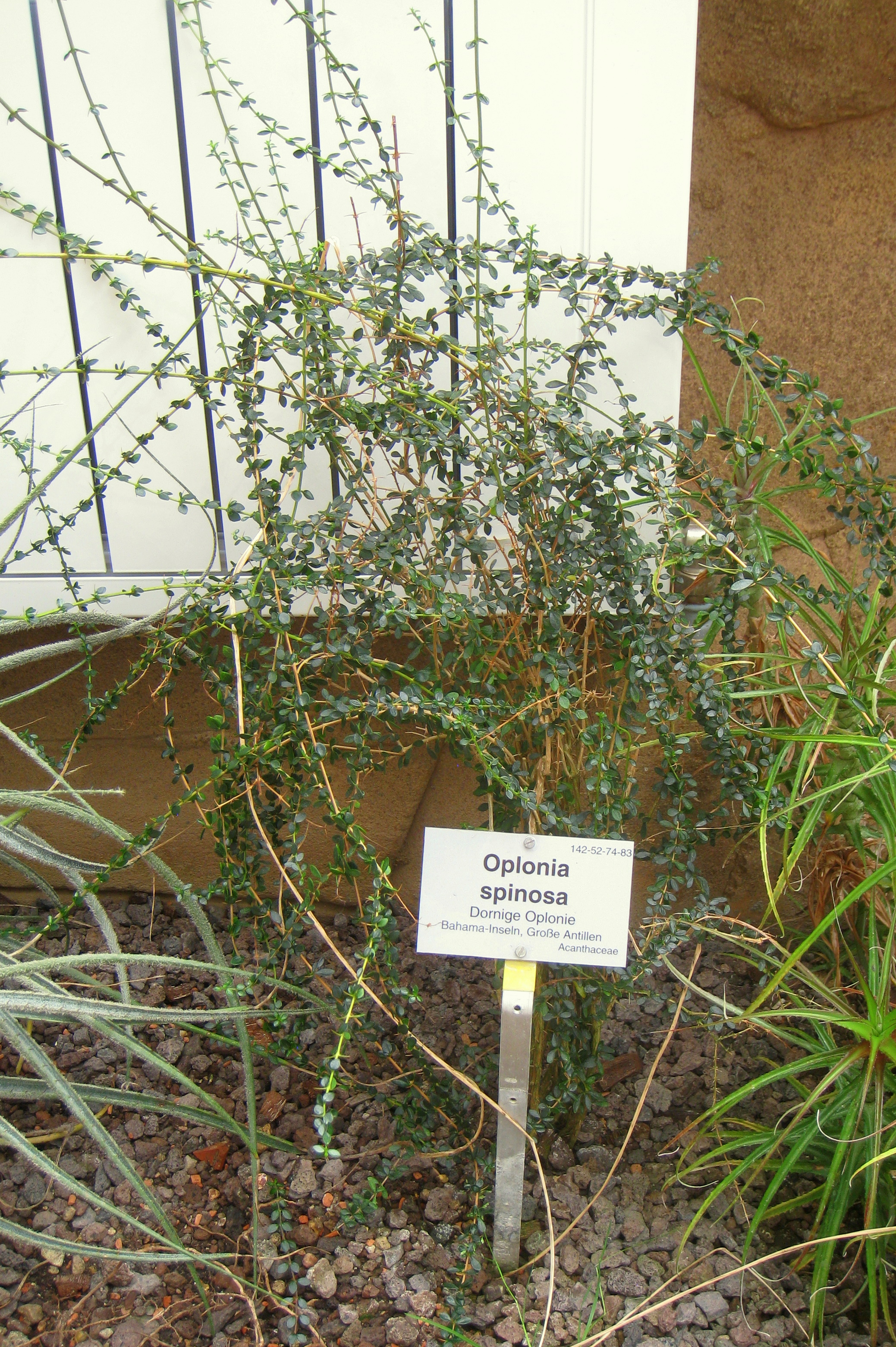

Scientific classification
- Kingdom: Plantae
- Clade: Tracheophytes
- Clade: Angiosperms
- Clade: Eudicots
- Clade: Asterids
- Order: Lamiales
- Family: Acanthaceae
- Genus: Oplonia
- Species: O. spinosa

Binomial name
- Oplonia spinosa (Jacq.) Raf.

= Oplonia spinosa =

Species of shrub

Oplonia spinosa, the pricklybush, is a species of plant in the family Acanthaceae, endemic to several Caribbean islands. It is a spiny shrub ranging in height from dwarf to 3 meters, with curved spines 4–12 mm long, and leaves variable in size and shape.

== Synonyms ==
- Anthacanthus spinosus (Jacq.) Nees
- Jasminum coeruleum Kuntze
- Justicia spinosa Jacq.
