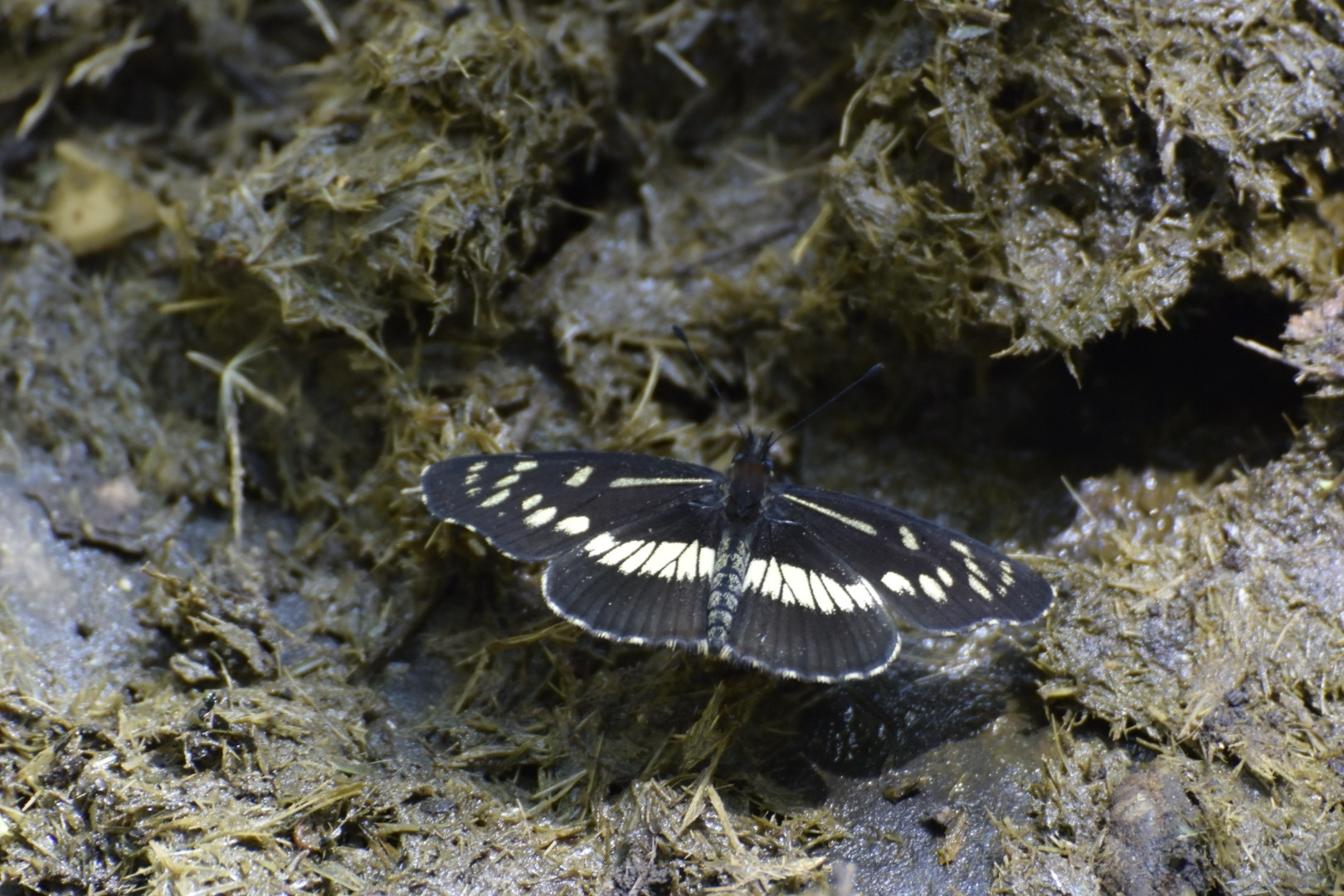
- Gnathotriche exclamationis

Scientific classification
- Kingdom: Animalia
- Phylum: Arthropoda
- Class: Insecta
- Order: Lepidoptera
- Family: Nymphalidae
- Tribe: Melitaeini
- Genus: Gnathotriche; C. & R. Felder, 1862

Synonyms
- Gnathotrusia Higgins, 1981

= Gnathotriche =

Genus of butterflies

Gnathotriche is a genus of butterflies in the family Nymphalidae found in South America.

== Species ==
- Gnathotriche exclamationis (Kollar, [1849]) (Venezuela, Colombia, Ecuador)
- Gnathotriche mundina (Druce, 1876) (Peru, Colombia) – false altinote
