= Timeline of biology and organic chemistry =

This timeline of biology and organic chemistry captures significant events from before 1600 to the present.

== Before 1600 ==
- c. 520 BC – Alcmaeon of Croton distinguished veins from arteries and discovered the optic nerve.
- c. 450 BC – Sushruta wrote the Sushruta Samhita, redacted versions of which, by the third century AD, describe over 120 surgical instruments and 300 surgical procedures, classify human surgery into eight categories, and introduce cosmetic surgery.
- c. 450 BC – Xenophanes examined fossils and speculated on the evolution of life.
- c. 380 BC – Diocles wrote the oldest known anatomy book and was the first to use the term anatomy.
- c. 350 BC – Aristotle attempted a comprehensive classification of animals. His written works include Historion Animalium, a general biology of animals, De Partibus Animalium, a comparative anatomy and physiology of animals, and De Generatione Animalium, on developmental biology.
- c. 300 BC – Theophrastos (or Theophrastus) began the systematic study of botany.
- c. 300 BC – Herophilos dissected the human body.
- c. 50–70 AD – Historia Naturalis by Pliny the Elder (Gaius Plinius Secundus) was published in 37 volumes.
- 130–200 – Claudius Galen wrote numerous treatises on human anatomy.
- c. 1010 – Avicenna (Abu Ali al Hussein ibn Abdallah ibn Sina) published The Canon of Medicine.
- 1543 – Andreas Vesalius publishes the anatomy treatise De humani corporis fabrica.

== 1600–1699 ==
- ?? – Jan Baptist van Helmont performed his famous tree plant experiment in which he shows that the substance of a plant derives from water, a forerunner of the discovery of photosynthesis.
- 1628 – William Harvey published An Anatomical Exercise on the Motion of the Heart and Blood in Animals
- 1651 – William Harvey concluded that all animals, including mammals, develop from eggs, and spontaneous generation of any animal from mud or excrement was an impossibility.
- 1665 – Robert Hooke saw cells in cork using a microscope.
- In 1661, 1664 and 1665, the blood cells were discerned by Marcello Malpighi. In 1678, the red blood corpuscles was described by Jan Swammerdam of Amsterdam, a Dutch naturalist and physician. The first complete account of the red cells was made by Anthony van Leeuwenhoek of Delft in the last quarter of the 17th century.
- 1668 – Francesco Redi disproved spontaneous generation by showing that fly maggots only appear on pieces of meat in jars if the jars are open to the air. Jars covered with cheesecloth contained no flies.
- 1672 – Marcello Malpighi published the first description of chick development, including the formation of muscle somites, circulation, and nervous system.
- 1676 – Anton van Leeuwenhoek observed protozoa and calls them animalcules.
- 1677 – Anton van Leeuwenhoek observed spermatozoa.
- 1683 – Anton van Leeuwenhoek observed bacteria. Leeuwenhoek's discoveries renew the question of spontaneous generation in microorganisms.

== 1700–1799 ==
- 1767 – Kaspar Friedrich Wolff argued that the tissues of a developing chick form from nothing and are not simply elaborations of already-present structures in the egg.
- 1768 – Lazzaro Spallanzani again disproved spontaneous generation by showing that no organisms grow in a rich broth if it is first heated (to kill any organisms) and allowed to cool in a stoppered flask. He also showed that fertilization in mammals requires an egg and semen.
- 1771 – Joseph Priestley demonstrated that plants produce a gas that animals and flames consume. This gas was oxygen.
- 1798 – Thomas Malthus discussed human population growth and food production in An Essay on the Principle of Population.

== 1800–1899 ==
- 1801 – Jean-Baptiste Lamarck began the detailed study of invertebrate taxonomy.
- 1802 – The term biology in its modern sense was propounded independently by Gottfried Reinhold Treviranus (Biologie oder Philosophie der lebenden Natur) and Lamarck (Hydrogéologie). The word was coined in 1800 by Karl Friedrich Burdach.
- 1809 – Lamarck proposed a modern theory of evolution based on the inheritance of acquired characteristics.
- 1817 – Pierre-Joseph Pelletier and Joseph Bienaimé Caventou isolated chlorophyll.
- 1820 – Christian Friedrich Nasse formulated Nasse's law: hemophilia occurs only in males and is passed on by unaffected females.
- 1824 – J. L. Prevost and J. B. Dumas showed that the sperm in semen were not parasites, as previously thought, but, instead, the agents of fertilization.
- 1826 – Karl von Baer showed that the eggs of mammals are in the ovaries, ending a 200-year search for the mammalian egg.
- 1828 – Friedrich Woehler synthesized urea; first synthesis of an organic compound from inorganic starting materials.
- 1836 – Theodor Schwann discovered pepsin in extracts from the stomach lining; first isolation of an animal enzyme.
- 1837 – Theodor Schwann showed that heating air will prevent it from causing putrefaction.
- 1838 – Matthias Schleiden proposed that all plants are composed of cells.
- 1839 – Theodor Schwann proposed that all animal tissues are composed of cells. Schwann and Schleinden argued that cells are the elementary particles of life.
- 1843 – Martin Barry reported the fusion of a sperm and an egg for rabbits in a 1-page paper in the Philosophical Transactions of the Royal Society of London.
- 1856 – Louis Pasteur stated that microorganisms produce fermentation.
- 1858 – Charles R. Darwin and Alfred Wallace independently proposed a theory of biological evolution ("descent through modification") by means of natural selection. Only in later editions of his works did Darwin used the term "evolution."
- 1858 – Rudolf Virchow proposed that cells can only arise from pre-existing cells; "Omnis cellula e celulla," all cell from cells. The Cell Theory states that all organisms are composed of cells (Schleiden and Schwann), and cells can only come from other cells (Virchow).
- 1864 – Louis Pasteur disproved the spontaneous generation of cellular life.
- 1865 – Gregor Mendel demonstrated in pea plants that inheritance follows definite rules. The Principle of Segregation states that each organism has two genes per trait, which segregate when the organism makes eggs or sperm. The Principle of Independent Assortment states that each gene in a pair is distributed independently during the formation of eggs or sperm. Mendel's trailblazing foundation for the science of genetics went unnoticed, to his lasting disappointment.
- 1865 – Friedrich August Kekulé von Stradonitz realized that benzene is composed of carbon and hydrogen atoms in a hexagonal ring.
- 1869 – Friedrich Miescher discovered nucleic acids in the nuclei of cells.
- 1874 – Jacobus van 't Hoff and Joseph-Achille Le Bel advanced a three-dimensional stereochemical representation of organic molecules and propose a tetrahedral carbon atom.
- 1876 – Oskar Hertwig and Hermann Fol independently described (in sea urchin eggs) the entry of sperm into the egg and the subsequent fusion of the egg and sperm nuclei to form a single new nucleus.
- 1884 – Emil Fischer began his detailed analysis of the compositions and structures of sugars.
- 1892 – Hans Driesch separated the individual cells of a 2-cell sea urchin embryo and shows that each cell develops into a complete individual, thus disproving the theory of preformation and showing that each cell is "totipotent," containing all the hereditary information necessary to form an individual.
- 1898 – Martinus Beijerinck used filtering experiments to show that tobacco mosaic disease is caused by something smaller than a bacterium, which he names a virus.

== 1900–1949 ==
- 1900 – Hugo de Vries, Carl Correns and Erich von Tschermak independently rediscovered Mendel's paper on heredity.
- 1902 – Walter Sutton and Theodor Boveri, independently proposed that the chromosomes carry the hereditary information.
- 1905 – William Bateson coined the term "genetics" to describe the study of biological inheritance.
- 1906 – Mikhail Tsvet discovered the chromatography technique for organic compound separation.
- 1907 – Ivan Pavlov demonstrated conditioned responses with salivating dogs.
- 1907 – Hermann Emil Fischer artificially synthesized peptide amino acid chains and thereby shows that amino acids in proteins are connected by amino group-acid group bonds.
- 1909 – Wilhelm Johannsen coined the word "gene."
- 1911 – Thomas Hunt Morgan proposed that genes are arranged in a line on the chromosomes.
- 1922 – Aleksandr Oparin proposed that the Earth's early atmosphere contained methane, ammonia, hydrogen, and water vapor, and that these were the raw materials for the origin of life.
- 1926 – James B. Sumner showed that the urease enzyme is a protein.
- 1928 – Otto Diels and Kurt Alder discovered the Diels-Alder cycloaddition reaction for forming ring molecules.
- 1928 – Alexander Fleming discovered the first antibiotic, penicillin
- 1929 – Phoebus Levene discovered the sugar deoxyribose in nucleic acids.
- 1929 – Edward Doisy and Adolf Butenandt independently discovered estrone.
- 1930 – John Howard Northrop showed that the pepsin enzyme is a protein.
- 1931 – Adolf Butenandt discovered androsterone.
- 1932 – Hans Adolf Krebs and Kurt Henseleit discovered the urea cycle.
- 1933 – Walter Norman Haworth and Tadeus Reichstein artificially synthesized vitamin C; first vitamin synthesis.
- 1935 – Rudolf Schoenheimer used deuterium as a tracer to examine the fat storage system of rats.
- 1935 – Wendell Stanley crystallized the tobacco mosaic virus.
- 1935 – Konrad Lorenz described the imprinting behavior of young birds.
- 1937 – Dorothy Crowfoot Hodgkin discovered the three-dimensional structure of cholesterol.
- 1937 – Hans Adolf Krebs and William Arthur Johnson, Carl Martius and Franz Knoop discovered the tricarboxylic acid cycle.
- 1937 – In Genetics and the Origin of Species, Theodosius Dobzhansky applies the chromosome theory and population genetics to natural populations in the first mature work of neo-Darwinism, also called the modern synthesis, a term coined by Julian Huxley.
- 1938 – Marjorie Courtenay-Latimer discovered a living coelacanth off the coast of southern Africa.
- 1940 – Donald Griffin and Robert Galambos announced their discovery of echolocation by bats.
- 1942 – Max Delbrück and Salvador Luria demonstrated that bacterial resistance to virus infection is caused by random mutation and not adaptive change.
- 1944 – Oswald Avery shows that DNA carried the hereditary information in pneumococcus bacteria.
- 1944 – Robert Burns Woodward and William von Eggers Doering synthesized quinine.
- 1945 – Dorothy Crowfoot Hodgkin discovered the three-dimensional structure of penicillin.
- 1948 – Erwin Chargaff showed that in DNA the number of guanine units equals the number of cytosine units and the number of adenine units equals the number of thymine units.

== 1950–1989 ==
- 1951 – The research group of Robert Robinson with John Cornforth (Oxford University) publishes their synthesis of cholesterol, while Robert Woodward (Harvard University) publishes his synthesis of cortisone.
- 1951 – Fred Sanger, Hans Tuppy completed their chromatographic analysis of the insulin amino acid sequence.
- 1952 – American developmental biologists Robert Briggs and Thomas King cloned the first vertebrate by transplanting nuclei from leopard frogs embryos into enucleated eggs. More differentiated cells were less able to direct development in the enucleated egg.
- 1952 – Alfred Hershey and Martha Chase showed that DNA is the genetic material in bacteriophage viruses.
- 1952 – Rosalind Franklin concluded that DNA is a double helix with a diameter of 2 nm and the sugar-phosphate backbones on the outside of the helix, based on x ray diffraction studies. She suspected the two sugar-phosphate backbones have a peculiar relationship to each other.
- 1953 – After examining Franklin's unpublished data, James D. Watson and Francis Crick published a double-helix structure for DNA, with one sugar-phosphate backbone running in the opposite direction to the other. They further suggested a mechanism by which the molecule can replicate itself and serve to transmit genetic information. Their paper, combined with the Hershey-Chase experiment and Chargaff's data on nucleotides, finally persuaded biologists that DNA is the genetic material, not protein.
- 1953 – Stanley Miller showed that amino acids can be formed when simulated lightning is passed through vessels containing water, methane, ammonia, and hydrogen
- 1954 – Dorothy Crowfoot Hodgkin discovered the three-dimensional structure of vitamin B_{12}.
- 1955 – Marianne Grunberg-Manago and Severo Ochoa discovered the first nucleic-acid-synthesizing enzyme (polynucleotide phosphorylase), which links nucleotides together into polynucleotides.
- 1955 – Arthur Kornberg discovered DNA polymerase enzymes.
- 1958 – John Gurdon used nuclear transplantation to clone an African Clawed Frog; first cloning of a vertebrate using a nucleus from a fully differentiated adult cell.
- 1958 – Matthew Stanley Meselson and Franklin W. Stahl proved that DNA replication is semiconservative in the Meselson-Stahl experiment
- 1959 – Max Perutz comes up with a model for the structure of oxygenated hemoglobin.
- 1959 – Severo Ochoa and Arthur Kornberg received the Nobel Prize for their work.
- 1960 – John Kendrew described the structure of myoglobin, the oxygen-carrying protein in muscle.
- 1960 – Four separate researchers (S. Weiss, J. Hurwitz, Audrey Stevens Niyogi and J. Bonner) discovered bacterial RNA polymerase, which polymerizes nucleotides under the direction of DNA.
- 1960 – Robert Woodward synthesized chlorophyll.
- 1961 – J. Heinrich Matthaei cracked the first codon of the genetic code (the codon for the amino acid phenylalanine) using Grunberg-Manago's 1955 enzyme system for making polynucleotides.
- 1961 – Joan Oró found that concentrated solutions of ammonium cyanide in water can produce the nucleotide adenine, a discovery that opened the way for theories on the origin of life.
- 1962 – Max Perutz and John Kendrew shared the Nobel prize for their work on the structure of hemoglobin and myoglobin.
- 1966 – Genetic code fully cracked through trial-and-error experimental work.
- 1966 – Kimishige Ishizaka discovered a new type of immunoglobulin, IgE, that develops allergy and explains the mechanisms of allergy at molecular and cellular levels.
- 1966 – Lynn Margulis proposed the endosymbiotic theory, that the eukaryotic cell is a symbiotic union of primitive prokaryotic cells. Richard Dawkins called the theory "one of the great achievements of twentieth-century evolutionary biology."
- 1968 – Fred Sanger used radioactive phosphorus as a tracer to chromatographically decipher a 120 base long RNA sequence.
- 1969 – Dorothy Crowfoot Hodgkin deciphered the three-dimensional structure of insulin.
- 1970 – Hamilton Smith and Daniel Nathans discovered DNA restriction enzymes.
- 1970 – Howard Temin and David Baltimore independently discovered reverse transcriptase enzymes.
- 1972 – Albert Eschenmoser and Robert Woodward synthesized vitamin B_{12}.
- 1972 – Stephen Jay Gould and Niles Eldredge proposed an idea they call "punctuated equilibrium", which states that the fossil record is an accurate depiction of the pace of evolution, with long periods of "stasis" (little change) punctuated by brief periods of rapid change and species formation (within a lineage).
- 1972 – Seymour Jonathan Singer and Garth L. Nicholson developed the fluid mosaic model describing cell membranes.
- 1974 – Manfred Eigen and Manfred Sumper showed that mixtures of nucleotide monomers and RNA replicase will give rise to RNA molecules which replicate, mutate, and evolve.
- 1974 – Leslie Orgel showed that RNA can replicate without RNA-replicase and that zinc aids this replication.
- 1977 – John Corliss and ten coauthors discovered chemosynthetically based animal communities located around submarine hydrothermal vents on the Galapagos Rift.
- 1977 – Walter Gilbert and Allan Maxam present a rapid DNA sequencing technique which uses cloning, base destroying chemicals, and gel electrophoresis.
- 1977 – Carl Woese and George E. Fox discover archaebacteria, a third domain of life distinct from prokaryotes and eukaryotes, by analyzing 16S ribosomal RNA.
- 1977 – Frederick Sanger and Alan Coulson presented a rapid gene sequencing technique which uses dideoxynucleotides and gel electrophoresis.
- 1978 – Frederick Sanger presented the 5,386 base sequence for the virus PhiX174; first sequencing of an entire genome.
- 1981 - The first extant species of remipedes, a new class of crustaceans, is described.
- 1982 – Stanley B. Prusiner proposed the existence of infectious proteins, or prions. His idea is widely derided in the scientific community, but he wins a Nobel Prize in 1997.
- 1983 – Kary Mullis invented "PCR" ( polymerase chain reaction), an automated method for rapidly copying sequences of DNA.
- 1984 – Alec Jeffreys devised a genetic fingerprinting method.
- 1985 – Harry Kroto, J.R. Heath, S.C. O'Brien, R.F. Curl, and Richard Smalley discovered the unusual stability of the buckminsterfullerene molecule and deduce its structure.
- 1986 – Alexander Klibanov demonstrated that enzymes can function in non-aqueous environments.
- 1986 – Rita Levi-Montalcini and Stanley Cohen received the Nobel Prize in Physiology or Medicine for their discovery of nerve growth factor (NGF).

== 1990–present ==
- 1990 – French Anderson et al. performed the first approved gene therapy on a human patient
- 1990 – Napoli, Lemieux and Jorgensen discovered RNA interference (1990) during experiments aimed at the color of petunias.
- 1990 – Wolfgang Krätschmer, Lowell Lamb, Konstantinos Fostiropoulos, and Donald Huffman discovered that Buckminsterfullerene can be separated from soot because it is soluble in benzene.
- 1995 – Publication of the first complete genome of a free-living organism.
- 1995 - Symbion pandora, the first known species from the phylum Cycliophora is described by Reinhardt Kristensen and Peter Funch.
- 1996 – Dolly the sheep was first clone of an adult mammal.
- 1998 – Mello and Fire publish their work on RNAi in c.elegans, for which they shared the 2006 Nobel Prize in Physiology or Medicine.
- 1999 – Researchers at the Institute for Human Gene Therapy at the University of Pennsylvania accidentally kill Jesse Gelsinger during a clinical trial of a gene therapy technique, leading the FDA to halt further gene therapy trials at the institute.
- 2000 - Reinhardt Kristensen and Peter Funch describe Limnognathia maerski, the first known species from the phylum Micrognathozoa.
- 2001 - First insects from the suborder Mantophasmatodea are discovered.
- 2001 – Publication of the first drafts of the complete human genome (see Craig Venter).
- 2002 – First virus produced 'from scratch', an artificial polio virus that paralyzes and kills mice.
- 2007 – Commercialization of Illumina Next generation Sequencing tools. This has become the most popular high-throughput sequencing system.
- 2012 – Use of CRISPR-Cas9 as a DNA-editing biotechnology tool.

== See also ==
- Timeline of medicine and medical technology
- History of biology
- History of chemistry
- Timeline of zoology
- Timeline of paleontology
- International Institute for Species Exploration
