= S. americanus =

S. americanus may refer to:

- Samolus americanus, a water rose species
- Schoenoplectus americanus, a bulrush species
- Scyllarus americanus, a lobster species in the genus Scyllarus
- Siphonorhis americanus, a bird species
- Spondylus americanus, an oyster species in the genus Spondylus
- Styrax americanus, a snowbell species in the genus Styrax
- Symbion americanus, a microscopic symbiote of the American lobster in the genus Symbion

== See also ==
- Americanus (disambiguation)
