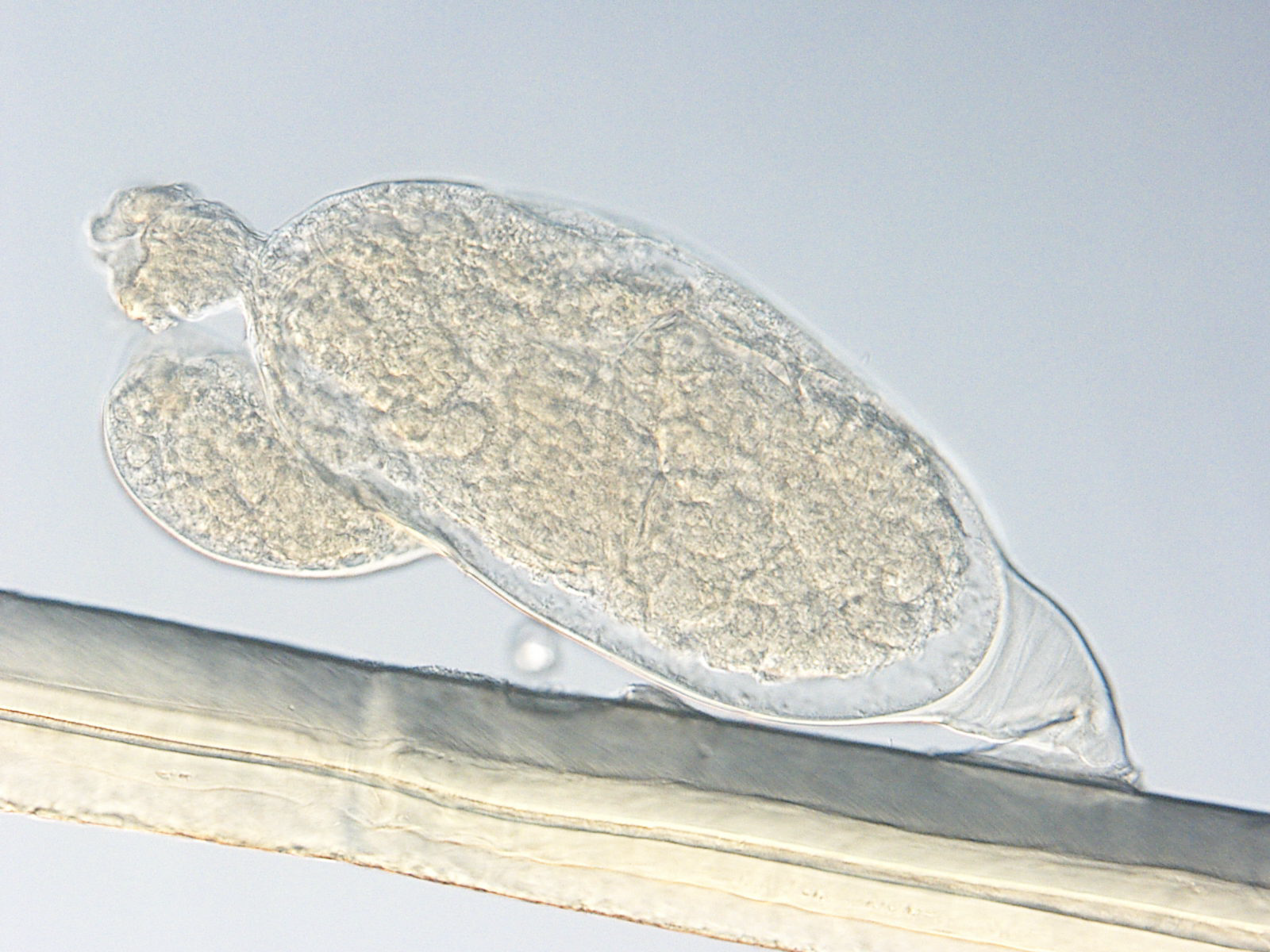
- Symbion americanus

Scientific classification
- Kingdom: Animalia
- Phylum: Cycliophora
- Class: Eucycliophora
- Order: Symbiida
- Family: Symbiidae
- Genus: Symbion
- Species: S. americanus

Binomial name
- Symbion americanus Obst, Funch & Kristensen, 2006

= Symbion americanus =

Species of marine animal

Symbion americanus is a species of primitive animal belonging to the family Symbiidae.

S. americanus is native to Northern America. It is a microscopic marine invertebrate that lives as an ectocommensal on the mouthparts of the American lobster, Homarus americanus, specifically attaching to the setae.
