= Peter Funch =

Danish zoologist

- Born: 1965 (age 60–61); Denmark
- Known for: Discovery of two new phyla of microscopic animals
- Scientific career
- Fields: Arctic biology

Peter Funch (born 1965) is a Danish zoologist. A member of Aarhus University Research on the Anthropocene, he studies microscopic organisms and arthropods. He works in arctic biology, researching in Greenland.

== Discoveries ==
In 1995, along with Reinhardt Møbjerg Kristensen, he discovered the microscopic aquatic animal Symbion pandora, which is so unlike any other known animals that he and Kristensen authored an entire new phylum for the species, Cycliophora. Along with Kristensen, he also discovered Limnognathia maerski, another aquatic microscopic animal with its new respective phylum.

He has also contributed to the creation of new scanning electron microscopy and light microscopy techniques.

== Publications ==
Funch has over 170 publications about multiple species.
