= Reinhardt Kristensen =

Danish biologist (born 1948)

- Born: 1948 (age 77–78); Denmark
- Known for: Discovery of three new phyla of microscopic animals
- Scientific career
- Fields: Invertebrate biology

Reinhardt Møbjerg Kristensen (born 1948) is a Danish invertebrate biologist, noted for the discovery of three new phyla of microscopic animals: the Loricifera in 1983, the Cycliophora in 1995, and the Micrognathozoa in 2000. He is also considered one of the world's leading experts on tardigrades. His recent field of work revolves mostly around arctic biology.

He is also known for documenting Dendrogramma, an invertebrate genus that was later classified as Siphonophorae of the family Rhodaliidae.

== Loricifera ==
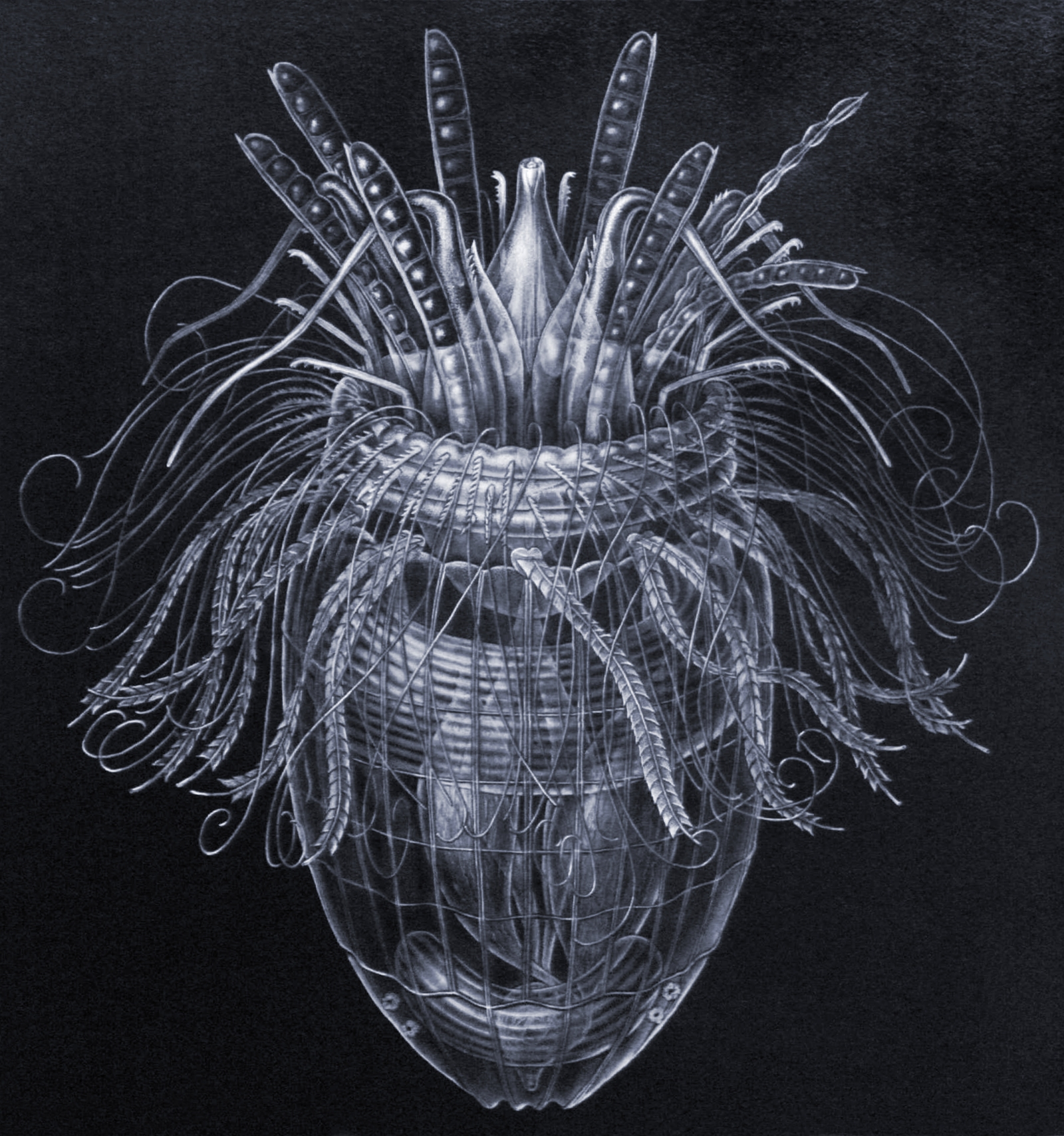
Illustration of the loriciferan phylum pliciloricus enigmatus discovered by Kirstensen, produced by Carolyn Bartlett Gast of the Smithsonian

Kristensen collected the first members of the Loricifera phylum in Roscoff, France, in 1970, but did not describe it until 1983.

== Cycliophora ==
Kristensen and Peter Funch described Symbion pandora, on the mouth-parts of Norwegian lobsters, in 1995; other species were later found on other types of lobsters.

== Micrognathozoa ==
Kristensen described Limnognathia maerski, the first (and so far only) known species in the group, in a cold spring on Disko Island in 2000.

== Selected publications ==
- Heiner, I.; Kristensen, R.M. 2009: Urnaloricus gadi nov. gen. et nov. sp. (Loricifera, Urnaloricidae nov. fam.), an aberrant Loricifera with a viviparous pedogenetic life cycle. ISSN 0362-2525 Journal of morphology, 270(2): 129-153. doi:10.1002/jmor.10671
- Jørgensen, A. and Kristensen, R.M., 2001. A New Tanarctid Arthrotardigrade with Buoyant Bodies. Zoologischer Anzeiger, vol. 240, issue 3-4: 425-439.
- Kristensen, R.M., 1982. New Aberrant Eutardigrades from Homothermic Springs on Disko Island, West Greenland. Proceedings of the Third International Symposium on the Tardigrada, August 3–6, 1980, Johnson City, Tennessee, USA: 203-220.
- Kristensen, R.M. and Higgins, R.P., 1984. A New Family of Arthrotardigrada (Tardigrada: Heterotardigrada) from the Atlantic Coast of Florida, U.S.A. Transactions of the American Microscopical Society, vol. 103, no. 3: 295-311. , Abstract
