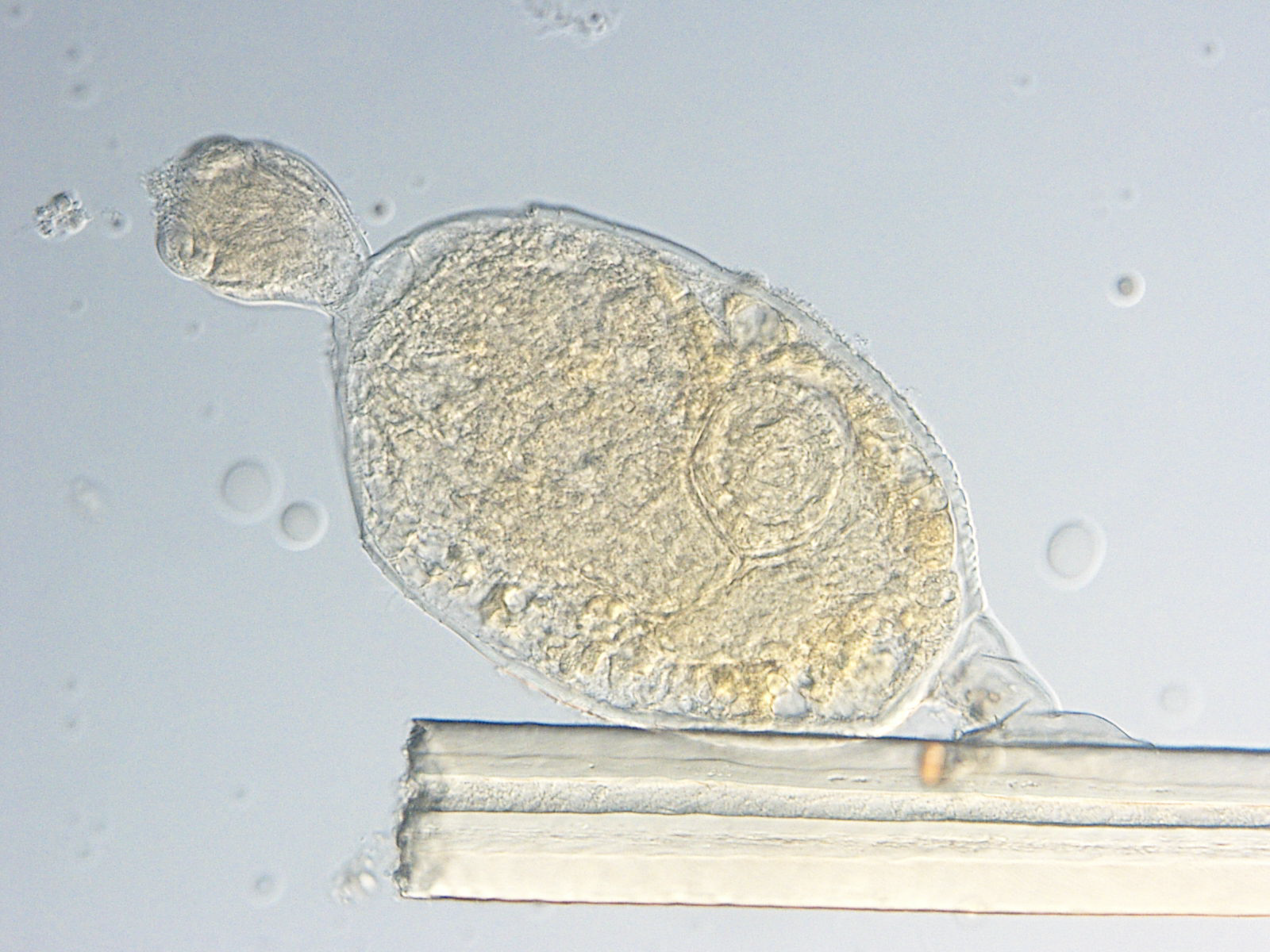
- Symbion pandora
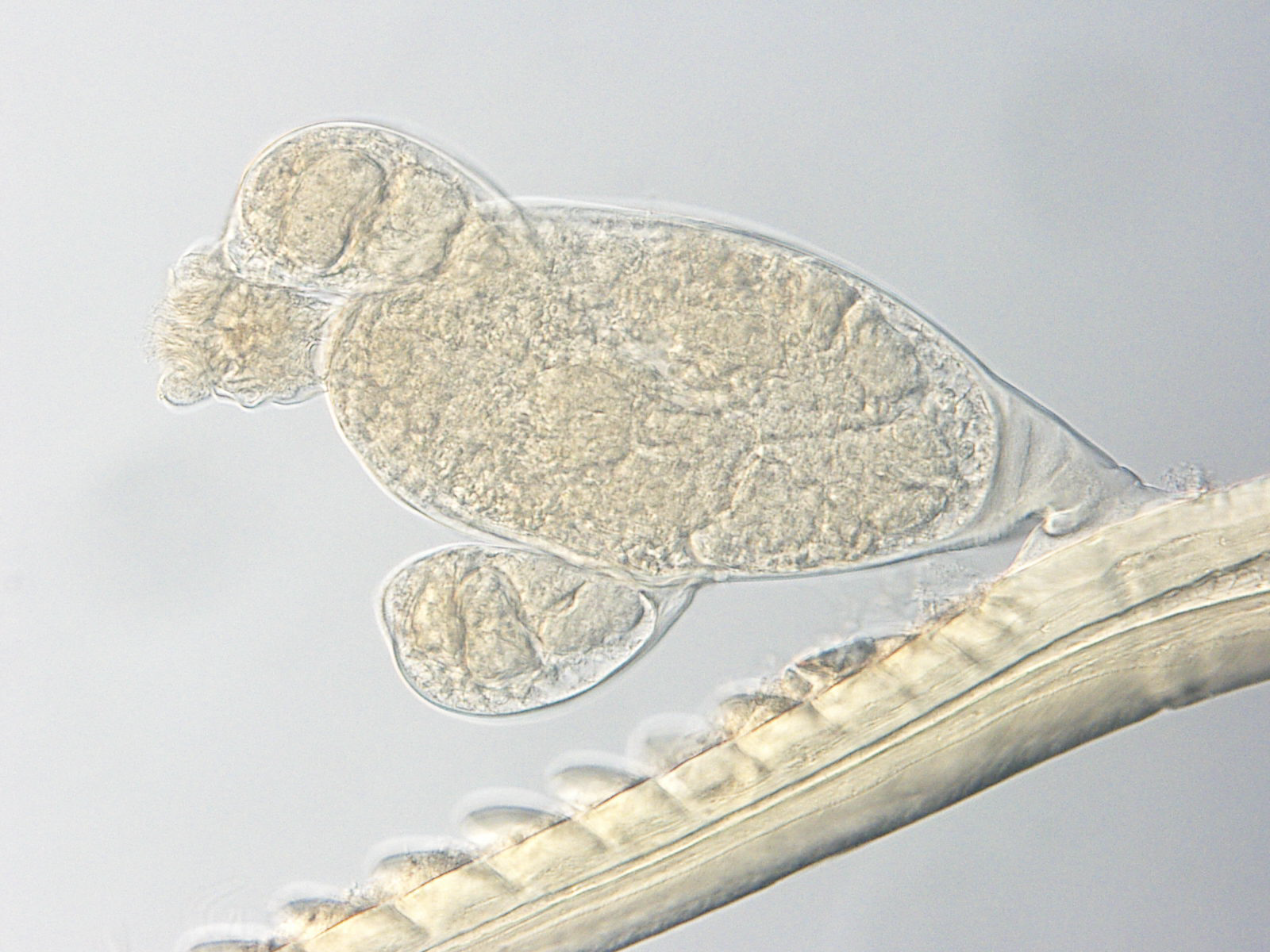
- Symbion americanus

Scientific classification
- Kingdom: Animalia
- Subkingdom: Eumetazoa
- Clade: ParaHoxozoa
- Clade: Bilateria
- Clade: Nephrozoa
- Clade: Protostomia
- Clade: Spiralia
- Superphylum: Lophotrochozoa
- Phylum: Cycliophora; Funch & Kristensen, 1995
- Class: Eucycliophora; Funch & Kristensen, 1995
- Order: Symbiida; Funch & Kristensen, 1995
- Family: Symbiidae; Funch & Kristensen, 1995
- Genus: Symbion; Funch & Kristensen, 1995

Species
- Symbion americanus Obst, Funch & Kristensen, 2005; Symbion pandora Funch & Kristensen, 1995; and at least one other (Unnamed Species)

= Symbion =

Genus of microscopic organism that are commensal with lobsters

Symbion is a genus of commensal aquatic animals, less than 0.5 mm wide, found living attached to the mouthparts of cold-water lobsters. They have sac-like bodies, and three distinctly different forms in different parts of their two-stage life-cycle. They appear so different from other animals that they were assigned their own phylum, Cycliophora, also called wheel wearers, shortly after being discovered in 1995. Cycliophora was the first new phylum of multicelled organism to be discovered since the Loricifera in 1983.

== Taxonomy ==
Symbion pandora was discovered in 1995 by Reinhardt Kristensen and Peter Funch on the mouthparts of the Norway lobster (Nephrops norvegicus). Other, related, species have since been discovered on:

- the American lobster (Homarus americanus, host to Symbion americanus)
- the European lobster (Homarus gammarus, host to an as yet unnamed species of Symbion)

The genus is so named because of its commensal relationship with the lobster (a form of symbiosis) – it feeds on the leftovers from the lobster's foods.

They are peculiar microscopic animals, with no obvious close relatives, which were therefore given their own phylum, called Cycliophora. The phylogenetic position of Symbion is still not finally settled. It is currently placed in the clade Polyzoa along with the phyla Ectoprocta and Entoprocta, based on genetic analysis.

== Description ==
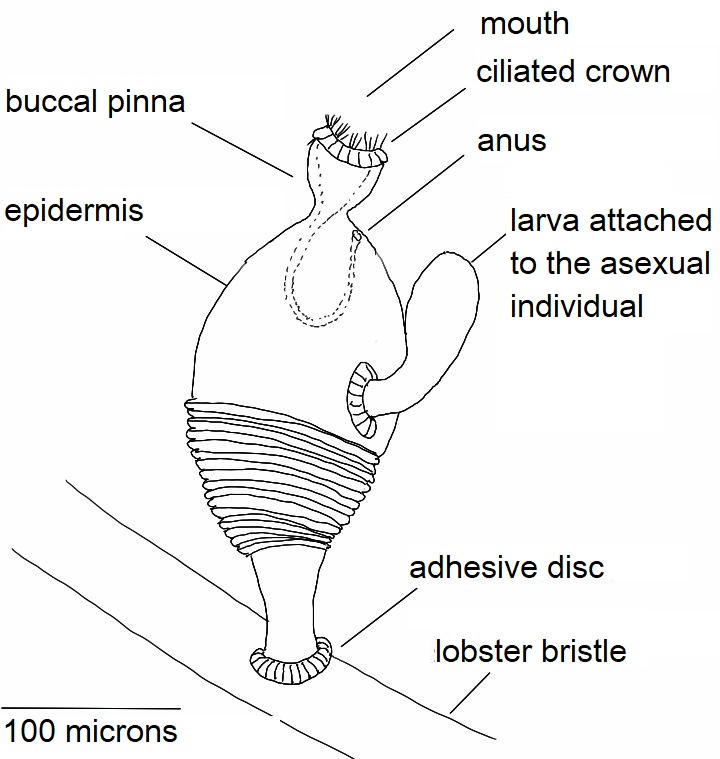
Diagram

Symbion pandora has a bilateral, sac-like body with no coelom. There are three basic life stages:

- Asexual Feeding Stage – At this stage, S. pandora is neither male nor female. It has a length of 347 μm and a width of 113 μm. On the posterior end of the sac-like body is a stalk with an adhesive disc, which attaches itself to the host. On the anterior end is a ciliated funnel (mouth) and an anus.
- Sexual Stage
  - Male – S. pandora has a length of 84 μm and a width of 42 μm during this stage. It has no mouth or anus, which signifies the absence of a digestive system. It also has two reproductive organs.
  - Female – S. pandora is the same size as the male in this stage. It does, however, have a digestive system which collapses and reconstitutes itself as a larva.

== Reproduction ==
Symbion reproduces both asexually and sexually, and has a complex reproduction cycle, a strategy evolved to produce as many offspring as possible that can survive and find a new host when the lobster they live on sheds its shell. The asexual individuals are the largest ones. The sexual individuals do not eat.

During the autumn, Symbion makes copies of itself, with a new individual growing inside the parent body, one offspring at the time. The new offspring attach themselves to an available spot on the lobster, begin to feed and eventually start making new copies of themselves.

In early winter, the asexual animals start producing males. When a male is born, it crawls away from its parent and glues itself to another asexual individual. Once attached, the male produces two dwarf males inside its body, which turns into a hollow pouch. Each of the two dwarf males are about one hundred times smaller than the asexual individual to which they are attached. Their bodies start out with about 200 cells, but this number lowers to just 47 by the time they reach maturity. Thirty-four of the cells form its nervous system, and three more become sensory cells used to help them feel their surroundings. Eight cells becomes mucous glands, which produce mucus that helps them move across the surface. The final two cells form the testes, which make the sperm that fertilize the female's egg. Most of the cells of the dwarf males also lose their nucleus and shrink to almost half their size, which is an adaptation that allows two mature individuals to fit inside the body of the parent male. Two males increases their chances to fertilize a female.

By late winter, when the large feeding individuals in the colony have males attached to their bodies, they start making females. Each female has a single egg inside her. When she is about to be born, one of the two dwarf males fertilizes her when she comes out. The fertilized female finds herself a place on the host's whiskers where she attaches herself. The developing embryo extracts nutrients from its mother, leaving her an empty husk by the time it is ready to be born. Symbion individuals who succeed in finding a new host will attach themselves to the host's mouthparts, eventually growing a stomach and mouthparts and morphing into a large, feeding and asexual form. The larval stage is unscientifically referred to as "sea worms".
