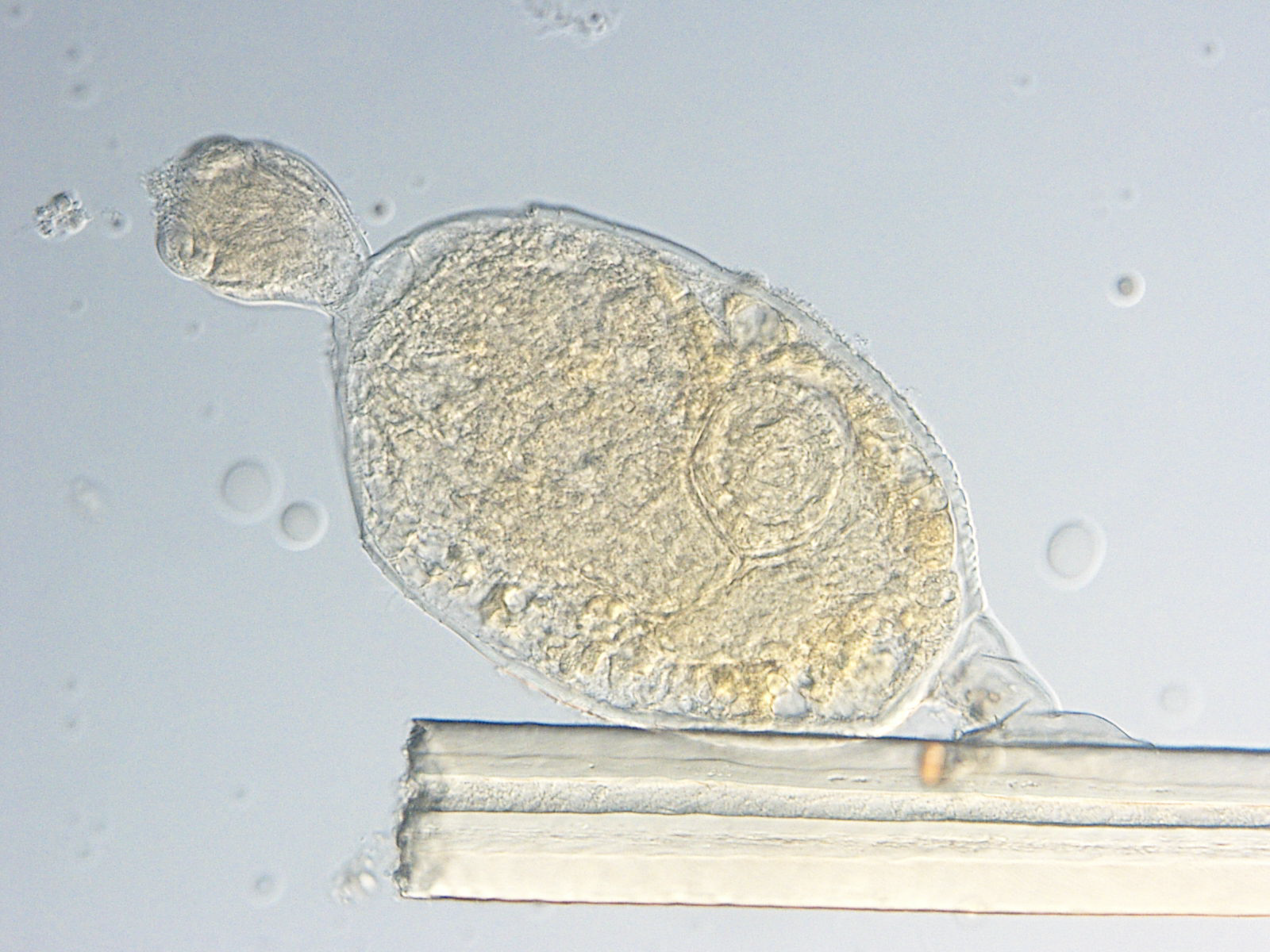
- Symbion pandora

Scientific classification
- Domain: Eukaryota
- Kingdom: Animalia
- Phylum: Cycliophora
- Class: Eucycliophora
- Order: Symbiida
- Family: Symbiidae
- Genus: Symbion
- Species: S. pandora

Binomial name
- Symbion pandora Funch & Kristensen, 1995

= Symbion pandora =

Species of aquatic parasites

Symbion pandora is a jug-shaped microscopic aquatic animal that dwells on the mouth-parts of Norway lobsters. The animals are less than ½ mm wide, with sac-like bodies, and three distinctly different forms in different parts of their three-stage life cycle.

== Classification and naming ==
They are so unlike any known animal that its discovery by Danish scientists in 1995 led to the creation of a new phylum. The phylum Cycliophora, from the Greek for 'carrying a small wheel', was named after the creature's circular mouth. Two other members of that phylum have since been discovered.

Symbion refers to the animal's symbiotic relationship with its lobster host while the specific epithet pandora refers to the part of the organism's life cycle that reminded Funch and Christensen of the mythical Pandora's box.

== Description ==
Symbion pandora has a bilateral, sac-like body with no coelom. There are three basic life stages:

- Asexual feeding stage – At this stage, S. pandora is neither male nor female. It has a length of 347 μm and a width of 113 μm. On the posterior end of the sac-like body is a stalk with an adhesive disc, which attaches itself to the host. On the anterior end is a ciliated funnel (mouth) and an anus.
- Sexual stage
  - Female – S. pandora has a length of 84 μm and a width of 42 μm during this stage. Its digestive system collapses and reconstitutes itself as a larva.
  - Male – S. pandora is the same size as the female in this stage. It has no mouth or anus, which signifies the absence of a digestive system. It also has two reproductive organs.

== Reproduction ==
Symbion pandora can reproduce both asexually by budding and sexually. The sexual reproductive cycle is triggered when the host crustacean molts its skin in order to grow: a feeding stage buds a male, which attaches to another feeding stage and triggers it to bud a female, which it impregnates. The female is able to swim, and finds another host crustacean, where the larva in her develops. The female dies, and the larva escapes, spawning another feeding stage on the new host.
