= List of Loricifera species =

This is a list of species within the phylum Loricifera, a group of small to microscopic marine scalidophoran sediment-dwelling animals.

== Nanaloricida Kristensen, 1983 ==
=== Nanaloricidae Kristensen, 1983 ===
==== Armorloricus Kristensen & Gad, 2004 ====
- Species Armorloricus davidi Kristensen & Gad, 2004
- Species Armorloricus elegans Kristensen & Gad, 2004
- Species Armorloricus kristenseni Heiner, 2004

==== Australoricus Heiner, Boesgaard & Kristensen, 2009 ====
- Species Australoricus oculatus Heiner, Boesgaard & Kristensen, 2009

==== Culexiregiloricus Gad, 2009 ====
- Species Culexiregiloricus trichiscalida Gad, 2009

==== Fafnirloricus Fujimoto, 2020 ====
- Species Fafnirloricus polymetallicus Fujimoto, 2020

==== Nanaloricus Kristensen, 1983 ====
- Species Nanaloricus gwenae Kristensen, Heiner & Higgins, 2007
- Species Nanaloricus khaitatus Todaro & Kristensen, 1998
- Species Nanaloricus mathildeae Neves, Kristensen & Møbjerg, 2021
- Species Nanaloricus mysticus Kristensen, 1983
- Species Nanaloricus valdemari Neves, Kristensen & Møbjerg, 2021

==== Phoeniciloricus Gad, 2004 ====
- Species Phoeniciloricus simplidigitatus Gad, 2004

==== Scutiloricus Neves, Kristensen & Møbjerg, 2021 ====
- Species Scutiloricus hugoi Neves, Kristensen & Møbjerg, 2021

==== Spinoloricus Heiner & Neuhaus, 2007 ====
- Species Spinoloricus cinziae Neves, Gambi, Danovaro & Kristensen, 2014
- Species Spinoloricus neuhausi Neves & Kristensen, 2016
- Species Spinoloricus turbatio Heiner & Neuhaus, 2007

=== Pliciloricidae Higgins & Kristensen, 1986 ===
==== Pliciloricus Higgins & Kristensen, 1986 ====
- Species Pliciloricus apteryx Sørensen, Grzelak, Kristensen & Herranz, 2022
- Species Pliciloricus cavernicola Heiner, Boesgaard & Kristensen, 2009
- Species Pliciloricus corvus Gad, 2005
- Species Pliciloricus diva Gad, 2009
- Species Pliciloricus dubius Higgins & Kristensen, 1986
- Species Pliciloricus enigmaticus Higgins & Kristensen, 1986
- Species Pliciloricus gracilis Higgins & Kristensen, 1986
- Species Pliciloricus hadalis Kristensen & Shirayama, 1988
- Species Pliciloricus leocaudatus Heiner & Kristensen, 2005
- Species Pliciloricus orphanus Higgins & Kristensen, 1986
- Species Pliciloricus pedicularis Gad, 2005
- Species Pliciloricus profundus Higgins & Kristensen, 1986
- Species Pliciloricus senicirrus Gad, 2005
- Species Pliciloricus shukeri Heiner & Kristensen, 2005
- Species Pliciloricus ukupachaensis Sørensen, Herranz, Grzelak, Shimabukuro, Kristensen & Zeppilli, 2023

==== Rugiloricus Higgins & Kristensen, 1986 ====
- Species Rugiloricus bacatus Heiner, 2008
- Species Rugiloricus californiensis Neves, Kristensen, Rohal, Thistle & Sørensen, 2018
- Species Rugiloricus carolinensis Higgins & Kristensen, 1986
- Species Rugiloricus cauliculus Higgins & Kristensen, 1986
- Species Rugiloricus manuelae Pardos & Kristensen, 2013
- Species Rugiloricus ornatus Higgins & Kristensen, 1986
- Species Rugiloricus polaris Gad & Martínez Arbizu, 2005
- Species Rugiloricus renaudae Kristensen, Neves & Gad, 2013
- Species Rugiloricus doliolius Gad, 2005^{1}

==== Scaberiloricus Sørensen, Herranz, Neves, Kristensen & Garraffoni, 2023 ====
- Species Scaberiloricus samba Sørensen, Herranz, Neves, Kristensen & Garraffoni, 2023

==== Titaniloricus Gad, 2005 ====
- Species Titaniloricus inexpectatovus Gad, 2005

==== Wataloricus Fujimoto, Yamasaki, Kimura, Ohtsuka & Kristensen, 2020 ====
- Species Wataloricus japonicus Fujimoto, Yamasaki, Kimura, Ohtsuka & Kristensen, 2020

=== Urnaloricidae Heiner & Kristensen, 2009 ===
==== Urnaloricus Heiner & Kristensen, 2009 ====
- Species Urnaloricus gadi Heiner & Kristensen, 2009
- Species Urnaloricus ibenae Neves, Kristensen, Rohal, Thistle & Sørensen, 2018

== Loricifera incertae sedis (Note: Temporary name) ==
=== Patuloricus Sørensen, Grzelak, Kristensen & Herranz, 2022 ===
- Species Patuloricus tangaroa Sørensen, Grzelak, Kristensen & Herranz, 2022

=== Tenuiloricus Neves & Kristensen, 2014 ===
- Species Tenuiloricus shirayamai Neves & Kristensen, 2014
