= Nanaloricidae =

Scientific classification
- Kingdom: Animalia
- Phylum: Loricifera
- Order: Nanaloricida
- Family: Nanaloricidae; Kristensen, 1983

Family of animals

Nanaloricidae is a family within the order Nanaloricida. Described by Reinhardt Møbjerg Kristensen in 1983, it includes the genus Nanaloricus with the species Nanaloricus mysticus, the first species described within Loricifera.

== Genera ==
This family includes 8 genera:

- Armorloricus Kristensen & Gad, 2004
- Australoricus Heiner, Boesgaard & Kristensen, 2009
- Culexiregiloricus Gad, 2009
- Fafnirloricus Fujimoto, 2020
- Nanaloricus Kristensen, 1983
- Phoeniciloricus Gad, 2004
- Scutiloricus Neves, Kristensen & Møbjerg, 2021
- Spinoloricus Heiner & Neuhaus, 2007
