= Hydrogenosome =

Mitochondrion-derived organelle

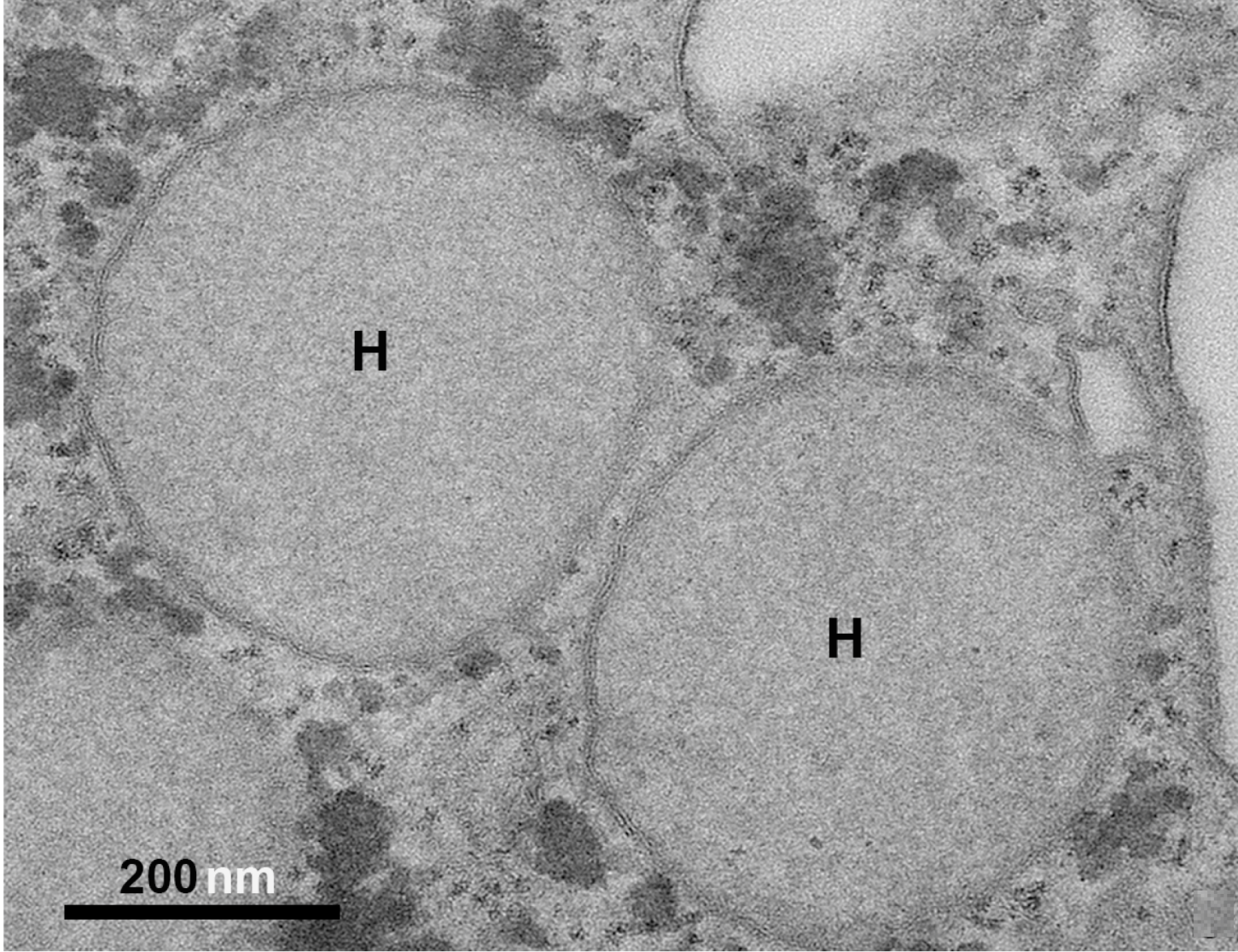
Hydrogensomes (H) of Trichomonas vaginalis under transmission electron microscope

A hydrogenosome is a double membrane-enclosed organelle found in some anaerobic eukaryotes such as ciliates, flagellates and fungi. (Note: Species of one of the latest discovered animal phylum named Loricifera also contain hydrogenosome-like structures.) Hydrogenosome is a type of mitochondrion that produces energy (ATP molecules) in the absence of oxygen, and lacks membrane foldings (cristae), unlike typical mitochondria. They are considered to have evolved from mitochondria to produce molecular hydrogen and ATP in anaerobic conditions, hence a mitochondrion-related organelle.

Hydrogenosomes were discovered in 1973 by Donald Gustav Lindmark and Miklós Müller. Because hydrogenosomes hold evolutionary lineage significance for organisms living in anaerobic or oxygen-stressed environments, many research institutions have since documented their findings on how the organelle differs in various sources.

== History ==
Hydrogenosomes were isolated, purified, biochemically characterized and named in 1973 by Donald Gustav Lindmark and Miklós Müller at the Rockefeller University. In addition to this discovery of novel organelle, they also demonstrated for the first time the presence of pyruvate:ferredoxin oxido-reductase and hydrogenase in eukaryotes. Further studies were subsequently conducted on the biochemical cytology and subcellular organization of several anaerobic protozoan parasites (ex: Trichomonas vaginalis, Tritrichomonas foetus, Giardia lamblia, and Entamoeba sp.).

Using information obtained from hydrogenosomal and biochemical cytology studies these researchers determined the mode of action of metronidazole (Flagyl). Today, metronidazole is recognized as a standard chemotherapeutic agent for the treatment of anaerobic infections.

Since their discovery, hydrogenosomes have been found in a variety of anaerobic unicellular ciliates, flagellates, and fungi. The most notable amongst these is the parasitic Trichomonas vaginalis.

In 2010, new species of microscopic animals in the phylum Loricifera, such as Rugiloricus, Pliciloricus, and Spinoloricus were described as animals (metazoans) capable of living exclusively in oxygenless conditions, the first ones ever known. Under the electron microscope they have organelles that look like hydrogenosomes. Doubt remains in whether they actually have hydrogenosomes.

== Description ==
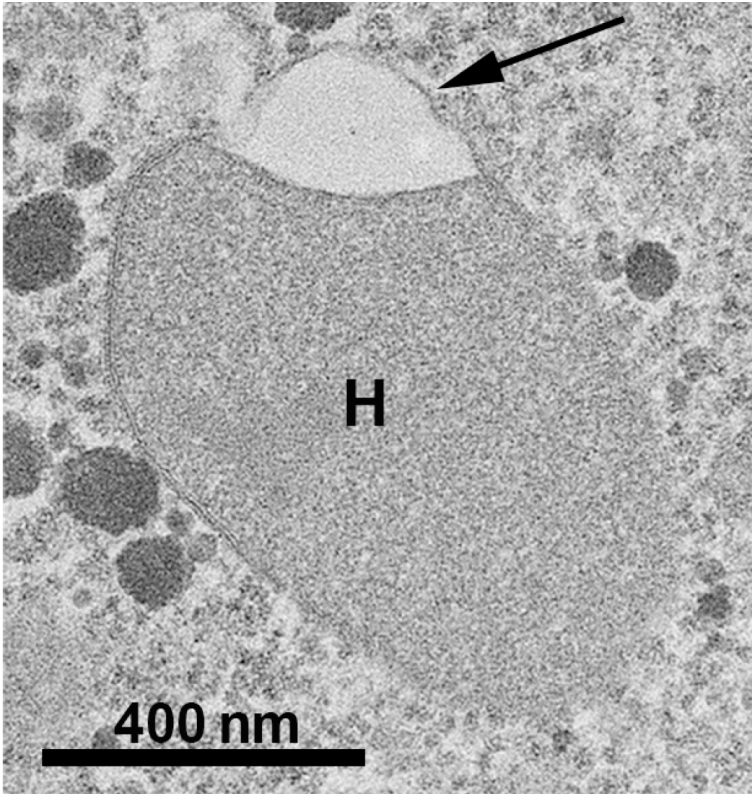
Hydrogenosome with cap (operculum)

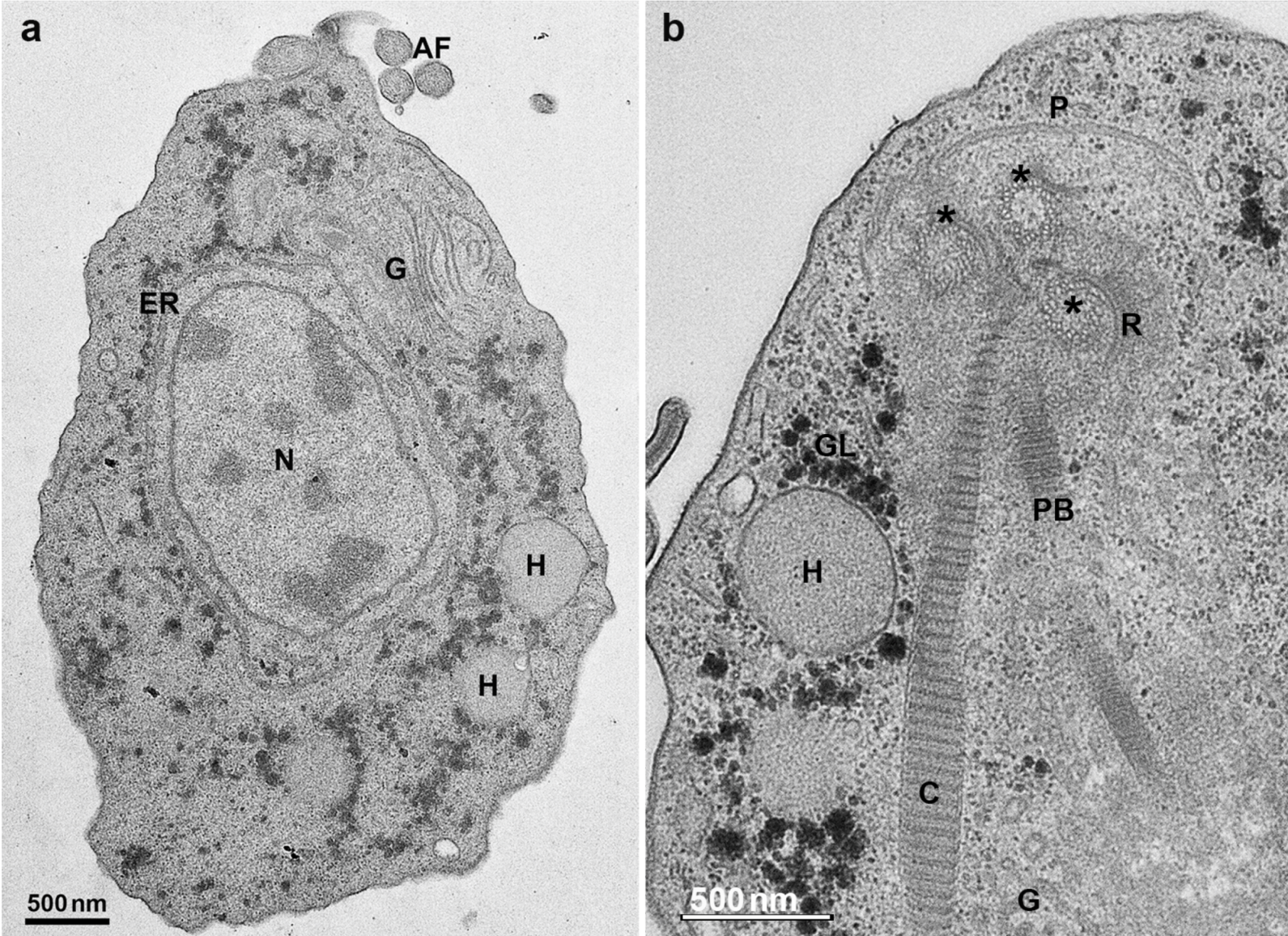
Trichomonas vaginalis. a) Whole body. b) Posterior region showing hydrogenosome (H)

Hydrogenosomes are organelles that are speculated to have evolved from mitochondria to provide a different mechanism for anaerobic ATP synthesis utilizing pyruvate. The reaction results in the production of molecular hydrogen, from which the organelle receives its name.

Hydrogenosomes range from 0.5-2 micrometers and are bound by a double membrane. They are most often dumbbell-shaped and found in large complexes of stacked hydrogenosomes. These stacks range from 4 or 5 (called juvenile complexes) to 20 or more hydrogenosomes.

In most cases, hydrogenosomes are genomeless, as a majority of the mitochondrial genome was transferred to the nucleus; because of this, all hydrogenosomal proteins are imported to the organelle. However, a hydrogenosomal genome recognizably similar to mtDNA has been detected in the cockroach ciliate Nyctotherus ovalis and the stramenopile Blastocystis.

Due to the fact that many organisms have evolved to fit their anaerobic environments, a multitude of organisms have independently evolved hydrogenosomes or structures with similar functions. The similarity between Nyctotherus and Blastocystis, which are only distantly related, is believed to be the result of convergent evolution, and calls into question whether there is a clear-cut distinction between mitochondria, hydrogenosomes, and mitosomes (another kind of degenerate mitochondria, one that has lost all ATP production and only retains the ability to make iron-sulfur clusters).

The evolution of hydrogenosome from mitochondria requires the acquisition of a hydrogenase followed by some loss of oxygenic metabolic function. In most known hydrogenosomes the reductive step has been quite complete, leaving behind fairly minimal systems. However, in a group of cilates where at least 4 independent events have happened among anaerobic descendants, the FeFe-hydrogenase had been acquired in their aerobic common ancestor.

== Organisms with hydrogensomes ==
Hydrogenosomes are present in different organisms across three kingdoms such as Protista, Fungi and Animalia. This span could only have occurred from convergent evolution of hydrogenosomes from mitochondria to fit an anaerobic environment.

=== Protists ===
- Metamonada flagellates
  - All Parabasalia: Trichomonas vaginalis, Tritrichomonas foetus, Histomonas meleagridis.
  - All Preaxostyla: Paratrimastix pyriformis (except for ones that have subsequently lost ATP-producing ability).
  - A genus of Formicata: Spironucleus.
- Discoba
  - All Heterolobosean:Psalteriomonas lanterna.
- SAR supergroup
  - Some ciliates: Nyctotherus ovalis, Metopus palaeformis, Trimyema compressum, Caenomorpha uniserialis, Dasytricha ruminantium (at least 4 independent events, some have DNA).
  - Blastocystis (functionally transitional, has DNA).

=== Fungi ===
- Anaerobic chytridiomycetes including species of Neocallimastix and Piromyces.

=== Animals ===
- Various loriciferans, like Spinoloricus cinziae, Rugiloricus sp. and Pliciloricus sp. possibly have hydrogensomes. Further biochemical and/or genetic characterization is needed for a definitive conclusion.

== ATP synthesis ==
Abb.1: Model of ATP-synthesis in trichomonad hydrogenosomes.

The typical hydrogenosome converts pyruvate (PYR) is turned into carbon dioxide (CO_{2}) and acetate while producing molecular hydrogen (H_{2}) and converting ADP into ATP. This pathway is called extended glycolysis as PYR is most commonly obtained by glycolysis in the cytoplasm.

A well-studied example is the hydrogenosomes of trichomonads. Its main pathway contains the following enzymes, all localized in the organelle:

- pyruvate:ferredoxin oxido-reductase, which converts pyruvate into acetyl-CoA and CO_{2} while reducing the ferredoxin.
- Hydrogenase, which converts H^{+} into H_{2} while oxidizing the ferredoxin.
- acetate:succinate CoA transferase, which converts succinate and acetyl-CoA to acetate and succinyl-CoA.
- Succinyl-CoA synthatase (in reverse), which converts succinyl-CoA and ADP + Pi into succinate, coenzyme A, and ATP.

Parts also in the trichomonad hydrogenosome but not part of the main loop include:

- Malate dehydrogenase (decarboxylating): Malate + NAD^{+} ⇔ Pyruvate + CO_{2} + NADH
- Adenylate kinase: ATP + AMP ⇔ 2 ADP
- Superoxide dismutase: 2H^{+} + 2O^{−}_{2} → O_{2} + H_{2}O_{2}
- Ferredoxin—NAD(+) reductase: reduced ferredoxin + NAD^{+} $\rightleftharpoons$ oxidized ferredoxin + NADH + H^{+}

=== Variations ===
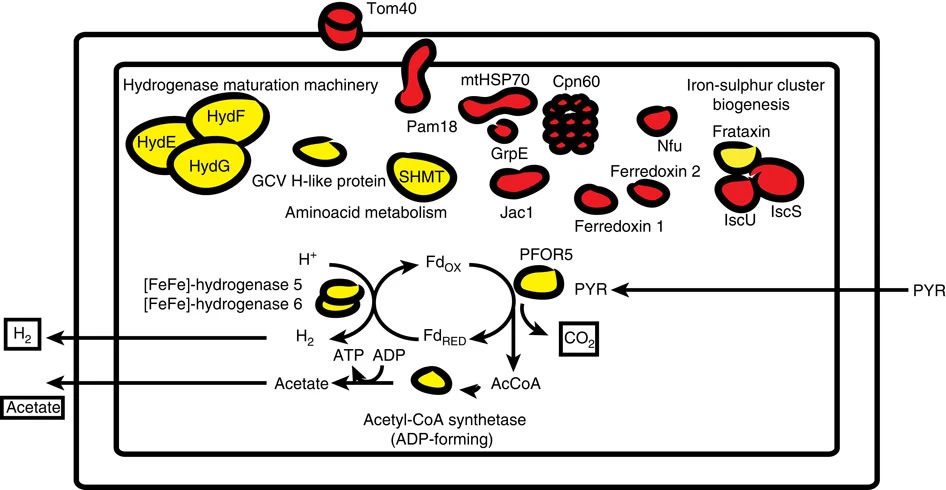
Activity in a Spironucleus salmonicida hydrogenosome. Those also found in the mitosome of G. intestinalis are in red.

Spironucleus salmonicida instead uses a acetyl-CoA synthetase (in reverse) to make ATP, skipping the need for handling succinate.

The hydrogenosome of Blastocystis is transitional and retains far more mitochondrial components. It retains complexs I, II, many transporters, amino acid biosynthesis pathways, an incomplete citric acid cycle, even oxidative phosphorylation. It has a hydrogenase, a pyruvate:ferredoxin oxido-reductase, and an alternative oxidase.

== Additional functions ==
Hydrogenosomes are also responsible for iron-sulfur cluster biogenesis, much like the mitochondrion and mitosome.

== See also ==
- Plastid
