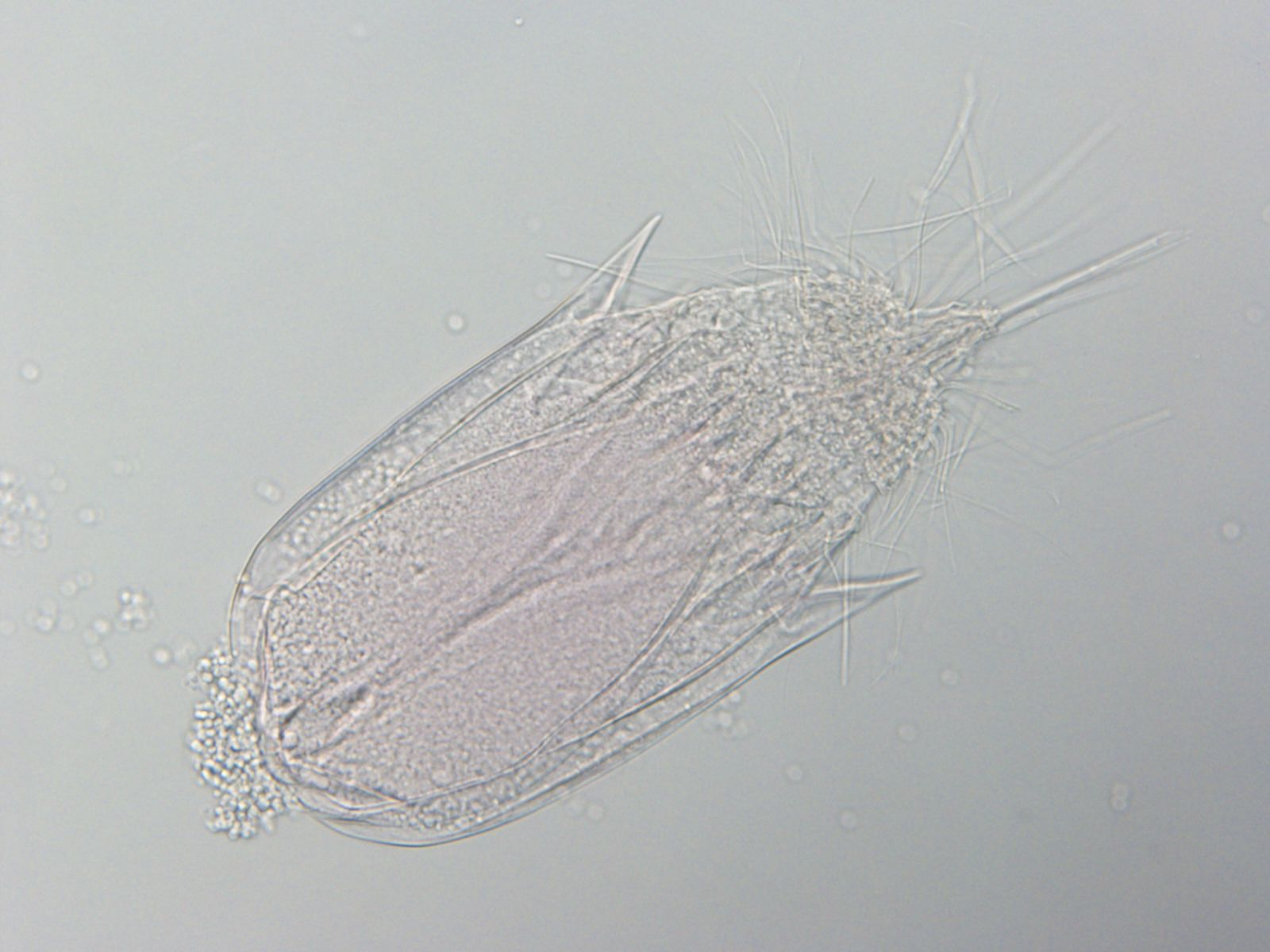

Scientific classification
- Kingdom: Animalia
- Phylum: Loricifera
- Order: Nanaloricida
- Family: Nanaloricidae
- Genus: Armorloricus
- Species: A. kristenseni

Binomial name
- Armorloricus kristenseni Heiner, 2004

= Armorloricus kristenseni =

Species of loriciferan

Armorloricus kristenseni is a marine nanaloricate loriciferan and one of the three species within Armorloricus.

== Origin ==
Armorloricus kristenseni was found in the Faroe Bank in the north atlantic. It was found in two cruises, one in 1992 and the other in 2001. It was found in three distinct locations, one from the 1992 expedition and two from 2001. They were all found on the Faroe Plateau—which includes the shelf—around 150 meters deep.

== Etymology ==
Armorloricus kristenseni was named in honor of Professor Reinhardt Møbjerg Kristensen. Kristensen described the phylum Loricifera in 1983. Kristensen also assisted with collecting the specimens in the 2001 expedition. This species was named as a tribute for the vigentennial of the description of Loricifera.

== Traits ==
There are nine rows of scalids in total.

=== Adults ===
- Elongated shape.
- Large lorica (abdomen) plates on the sides.
- Extremely long, very thin third row of scalids^{1}.
- Males have long claspers.
- Rotiform (wheel shaped) structure of the subcuticular glands (glands that are below the upper layer of the skin).

==== Male ====
The male that was chosen to describe the species (holotype) was 278 μm long (including the mouth tube). The diameter of the abdomen was 105 μm.

==== Female ====
The female that was chosen to describe the species (allotype^{2}) was 332 μm long, but the diameter of its abdomen is only 97 μm.

=== Higgins-larvae ===
- A singular, long middorsal (the middle of the back) scalid which has a hexagon shaped base.
- An unciform^{3} midventral (being in the middle of the abdomen) pair of scalids (row 4).
- Long and serrated scalids occurring in pairs (row 6).
- Asymmetrical basal plates^{4} with many teeth.

== Notes ==
^1 The scalids have a filiform (threadlike) structure.

^2 The one that this article is referring to is zoological nomenclature.

^3 Unciform means hook shaped.

^4 Basal plates are places where the skin is thicker. A trichoscalid is seen on a basal plate in Page 168, Figure 2, Image A. Abbreviations are on page 166.

== See also ==
- Armorloricus elegans
- Armorloricus davidi
