= Rugiloricus manuelae =

Scientific classification
- Kingdom: Animalia
- Phylum: Loricifera
- Order: Nanaloricida
- Family: Pliciloricidae
- Genus: Rugiloricus
- Species: R. manuelae

Binomial name
- Rugiloricus manuelae Pardos & Kristensen, 2013

Rugiloricus manuelae is one of the ten species within the genus Rugiloricus. It is the first Loriciferan found near the Iberian Peninsula. It was described by Pardos and Kristensen in 2013.

== Taxonomy ==
This species was collected at a depth of 200 - 600 meters. It was found to the north of Spain, between the cities of Gijón and Santander.

== Etymology ==
This species was named in homage to the wife of Fernando Pardos, Manuela Mayo.

== Traits ==
=== Adults ===
Males are 285 μm in length and have eight long clavoscalids with serrated ends. They have a double organ in that they have two close mid-abdominal clavoscalids.

- Males' necks have 15 trichoscalids (very long thin scalids only found on the neck).
- Their loricas have 40 vertical creases.
- They have three compressions across these creases, two in the front and one in the back.
- Their fourth row of scalids is made up of alternating types of spinoscalids.
- Their ninth row of scalids is made up of 60 scalids, alternating between long spines and rounded structures with small teeth.

=== Higgins larvae ===
- Mouth cone is symmetrical from central areas to outermost areas six ways. It is divided into three parts.
- Eight clavoscalids with large bases and tips similar to fingers.
- The first row of spinoscalids is more lengthy, with the two found on the mid-abdominal area being very large and fused together at their bases.
- The third, fourth, and fifth rows of spinoscalids are similar to claws.
