= Pliciloricus dubius =

Scientific classification
- Kingdom: Animalia
- Phylum: Loricifera
- Order: Nanaloricida
- Family: Pliciloricidae
- Genus: Pliciloricus
- Species: P. dubius

Binomial name
- Pliciloricus dubius Higgins & Kristensen, 1986.

Species of tiny marine invertebrate

Pliciloricus dubius is a marine Loriciferan species of genus Pliciloricus described by Higgins & Kristensen 1986.

== Distribution ==
Pliciloricus dubius is a species that has been designated for the waters of the Atlantic Ocean north and northwest.
