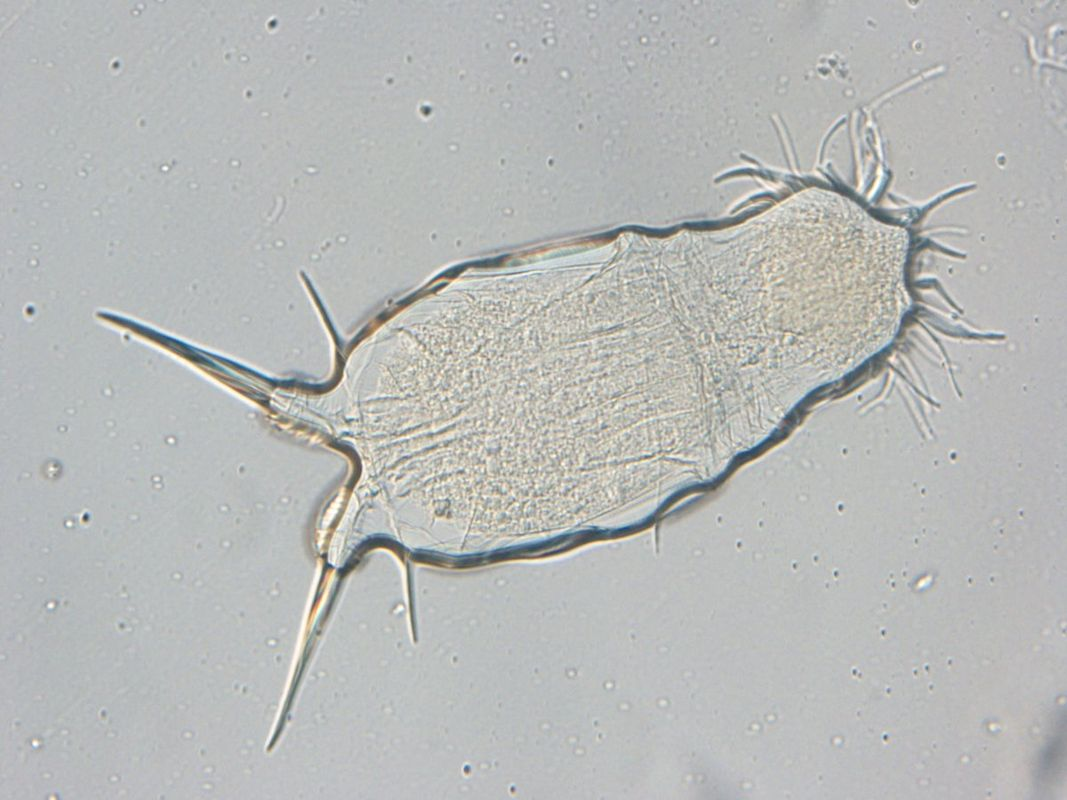

Scientific classification
- Kingdom: Animalia
- Phylum: Loricifera
- Order: Nanaloricida
- Family: Nanaloricidae
- Genus: Armorloricus
- Species: A. davidi

Binomial name
- Armorloricus davidi Kristensen & Gad, 2004

= Armorloricus davidi =

Species within the genus Armorloricus

Armorloricus davidi is a nanaloricate loriciferan. It is found in the surface layer of shell gravel at a depth of 50-55 meters. It is an animal which is one of three species within the genus Armorloricus, described by Kristensen and Gad in 2004. Adults have smooth lorica, meaning a smooth outer covering which acts as armor. It has (relatively) large midventral and laterodorsal plates, which are seen connecting its lorica to its mouth tube. It has a lengthy but narrow mouth tube.

Many of its traits are shared by other species within the genus.

Armorloricus davidi is small or microscopic, as its entire phylum is.

== Traits ==
The dorsal plate of the lorica is divided lengthwise into three parts.

This species has displayed sexual dimorphism. The toes and lorica of this species include a honeycomb sculpture.

Males of this species are 380 μm in length (fully extended) and the maximum width of their loricas is 150 μm. Females are 420 μm in length and the maximum width of their loricas are 162 μm.

Mucrones are the long parts at the bottom (if the species is facing upwards)^{1}. There are two of them, one on each side, and they are end pointed away from the body with narrow tips.

This species is part of Loricifera, therefore, in its adulthood, it is made up of a mouth cone, introvert (the part in between the mouth cone and neck which has the scalids^{2}), neck, thorax, and lorica (abdomen) and is symmetrical.

The clavoscalids^{3} are the first (innermost) row of scalids. In males^{4}, they are claval.

The other scalids are known as spinoscalids. In Higgins-larvae, spinoscalids are spiny or unciferous (hooklike)^{5}.

This species has displayed sexual dimorphism. Males have two clavoscalids which aren't present in females.

This species can retract itself into its lorica (abdomen).

== Notes ==
^1 From the perspective of a 2d picture in which the organisms mouth is oriented to the top.

^2 The scalids have a filiform (threadlike) structure. They can be seen in the image at the top, labeled with CS (clavoscalids) and SS (spinoscalids). The first (innermost) row of scalids are clavoscalids and the rest are spinoscalids.

^3 The clavoscalids got their name from being claval. Clavo- as in claval. Claval means club-shaped.

^4 The female ones are spiny and aren't branchiose (they don't branch out).

^5 Unciferous means hooklike (shaped like a hook).

== See also ==
- Armorloricus elegans
- Armorloricus kristenseni
