= Orstenoloricus =

Orstenoloricus Temporal range: Middle Cambrian

Scientific classification
- Kingdom: Animalia
- Stem group: Loricifera
- Genus: †Orstenoloricus; Maas et al, 2009
- Species: †O. shergoldii

Binomial name
- †Orstenoloricus shergoldii Maas et al, 2009

Extinct genus of loriciferan

Orstenoloricus is a loriciferan genus (likely a member of the stem group), preserved by three-dimensional mineralization in the Monastery Creek Formation, an Orsten-type setting in the mid-Cambrian of Australia. It contains one species, Orstenoloricus shergoldii.

== Description ==
Orstenoloricus is known from 14 specimens, with one (CPC 39929) being markedly different in proportions to the rest. As for the thirteen "normal" specimens, they have a short neck with around 10 annular folds, which was most likely circular in cross-section. The folds are arranged somewhat like an accordion with prominent peaks and ridges, in addition to having an overlying zigzag pattern. The last fold is an apparent transition to the lorica, with less distinct zigzag patterns and spines arising from its posterior "slope". The length of these spines is not known, as only their sockets and proximal ends are preserved. However, the longest piece of spine preserved is around 30 micrometers long and 25 micrometers wide. The lorica is composed of 20 plates oriented lengthwise, with a gently concave shape in between a ridge at each border of the plate. Unusually this lorica seems to be capable of inflating or deflating due to its blade-like plates. The inflated state is as previously described, meanwhile in its deflated state every other ridge seems to collapse inwards, with the cross-section being more like a ten-pointed star. The lorica ends in a round, blunt tip, with a slit in the centre likely representing an anus. While no fine structures are present on the lorica, it is likely that the epicuticle (outermost layer of the cuticle) has not preserved, and any hypothetical structures alongside it. The second morphotype, consisting of the one "abnormal" specimen, has a much longer neck in proportion to the lorica, with 14 folds instead of the standard 10. The area surrounding the anus is also larger, with a pair of spines on an abaxial (facing away from the body axis) ridge, alongside a less slit-like anus. The presence of a pair of anterior and posterior spines places Orstenoloricus as a loriciferan, however the absence of toes suggests it lies within the stem-group. This genus is likely similar to the larva of Sirilorica, however that form is likely more basal as it is several hundred times larger than any other loriciferan.

== Etymology ==
The name Orstenoloricus derives from the genus's relation to Loricifera, alongside the preservation mode of the site it comes from. The species name shergoldii honours John Shergold, an Australian palaeontologist who led the expedition on which the fossils were collected.
