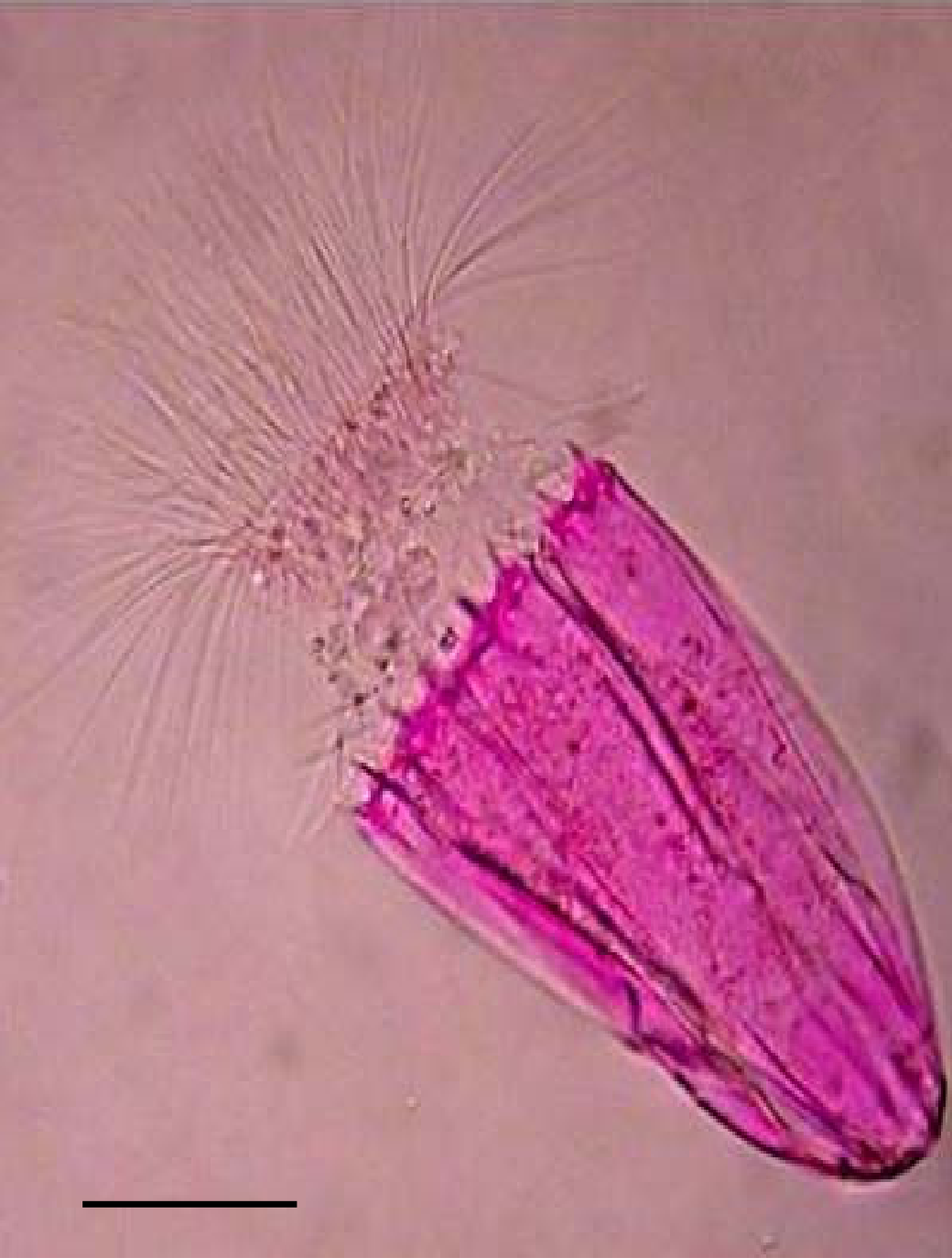

Scientific classification
- Kingdom: Animalia
- Phylum: Loricifera
- Order: Nanaloricida
- Family: Nanaloricidae
- Genus: Spinoloricus
- Species: S. cinziae

Binomial name
- Spinoloricus cinziae Neves, Gambi, Danovaro & Kristensen, 2014

= Spinoloricus cinziae =

Species of tiny marine invertebrate

Spinoloricus cinziae is an animal species described in 2014 in the phylum Loricifera.

It was the first described animal species that does not require oxygen at any point during its life. The species, along with two other newly discovered species, Rugiloricus nov. sp. and Pliciloricus nov. sp. (all of order Nanaloricida), were found in the sediment of the anoxic L'Atalante basin of the Mediterranean Sea.

Electron microscope images show that the species' cellular innards appear to be adapted for a zero-oxygen life. Their mitochondria appear to act as hydrogenosomes, organelles which provide energy in some anaerobic single-celled creatures.

At adulthood, this species is characterized by a mouth cone with eight oral ridges, a neck with eight single trichoscalids alternating with seven double trichoscalids, as well as lorical plates with spikes located at the corners. More than 30 species in this group have been described.
