= Incertae sedis (Loricifera) =

Loricifera incertae sedis is a subphylum of Loricifera. It is a temporary name and has two genera, both being monospecific.

== Genera ==
=== Patuloricus Sørensen, Grzelak, Kristensen & Herranz, 2022 ===
- Species Patuloricus tangaroa Sørensen, Grzelak, Kristensen & Herranz, 2022

=== Tenuiloricus Neves & Kristensen, 2014 ===
- Species Tenuiloricus shirayamai Neves & Kristensen, 2014
