= Rugiloricus cauliculus =

Scientific classification
- Kingdom: Animalia
- Phylum: Loricifera
- Order: Nanaloricida
- Family: Pliciloricidae
- Genus: Rugiloricus
- Species: R. cauliculus

Binomial name
- Rugiloricus cauliculus Higgins & Kristensen, 1986

Species of tiny marine invertebrate

Rugiloricus cauliculus is a species of marine animal of the phylum Loricifera and the family Pliciloricidae. The species was described by Higgins & Kristensen in 1986, however other sources such as OBIS indicate that discovery of the species occurred on 19 November 1983.

== Distribution ==
This species is noted for the coast of Atlantic Ocean of North Carolina, United States.
