= Carcinology =

Study of crustaceans

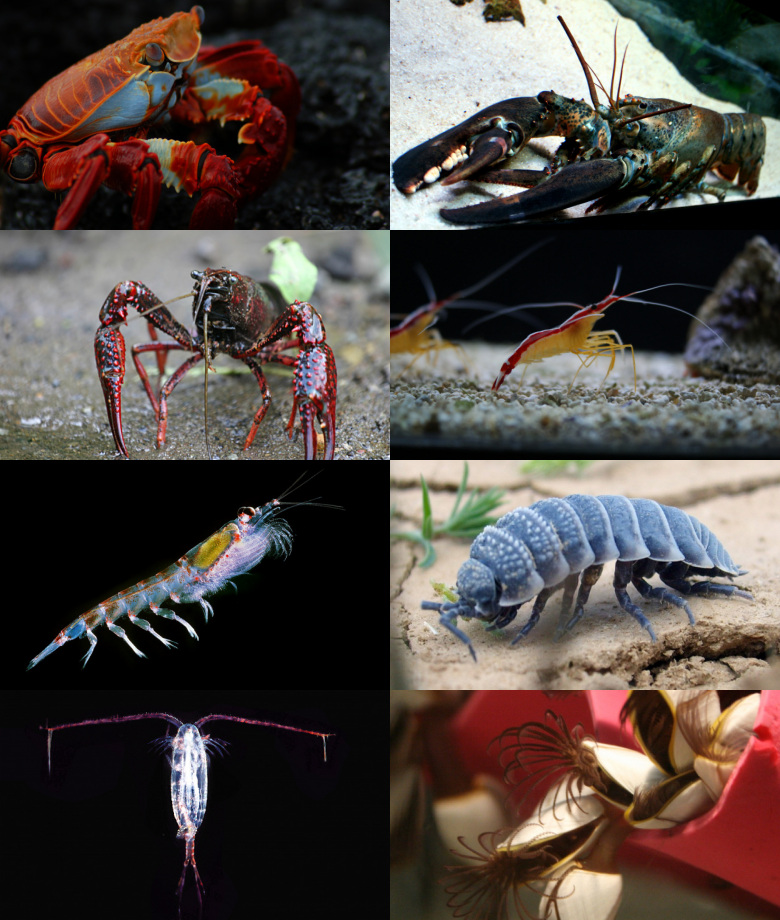
Various crustaceans, all of interest to carcinologists.

Carcinology, from Ancient Greek καρκίνος (karkínos), meaning "crab", and λόγος (lógos), meaning "study", is a branch of zoology that consists of the study of crustaceans. Crustaceans are a large traditional subphylum of arthropods classified by having a hard exoskeleton made of chitin or chitin and calcium, three body regions, and jointed, paired appendages. Crustaceans include lobsters, crayfish, shrimp, krill, copepods, barnacles and crabs. Most crustaceans are aquatic, but some can be terrestrial, sessile, or parasitic. Other names for carcinology are malacostracology, crustaceology, and crustalogy, and a person who studies crustaceans is a carcinologist or occasionally a malacostracologist, a crustaceologist, or a crustalogist.

The word carcinology derives from Greek καρκίνος, karkínos, "crab"; and -λογία, -logia.

== Subfields ==
Carcinology is a subdivision of arthropodology, the study of arthropods which includes arachnids, insects, and myriapods. Carcinology branches off into taxonomically oriented disciplines such as:

- astacology – the study of crayfish
- cirripedology – the study of barnacles
- copepodology – the study of copepods

== Journals ==
Scientific journals devoted to the study of crustaceans include:

- Crustaceana
- Journal of Crustacean Biology
- Nauplius

== See also ==
- Entomology
- List of carcinologists
