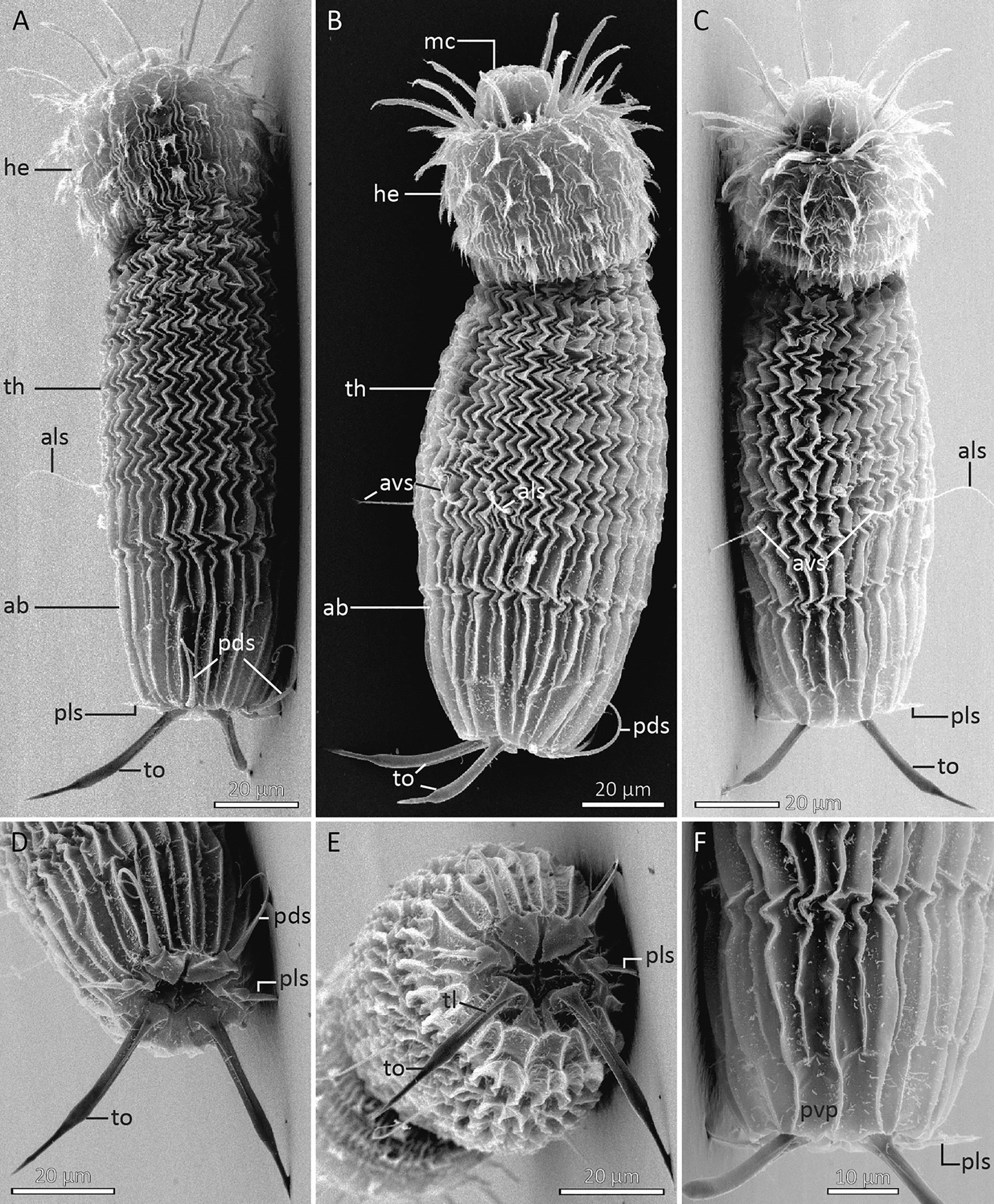
- Electron micrographs of scaberiloricus samba early instar.
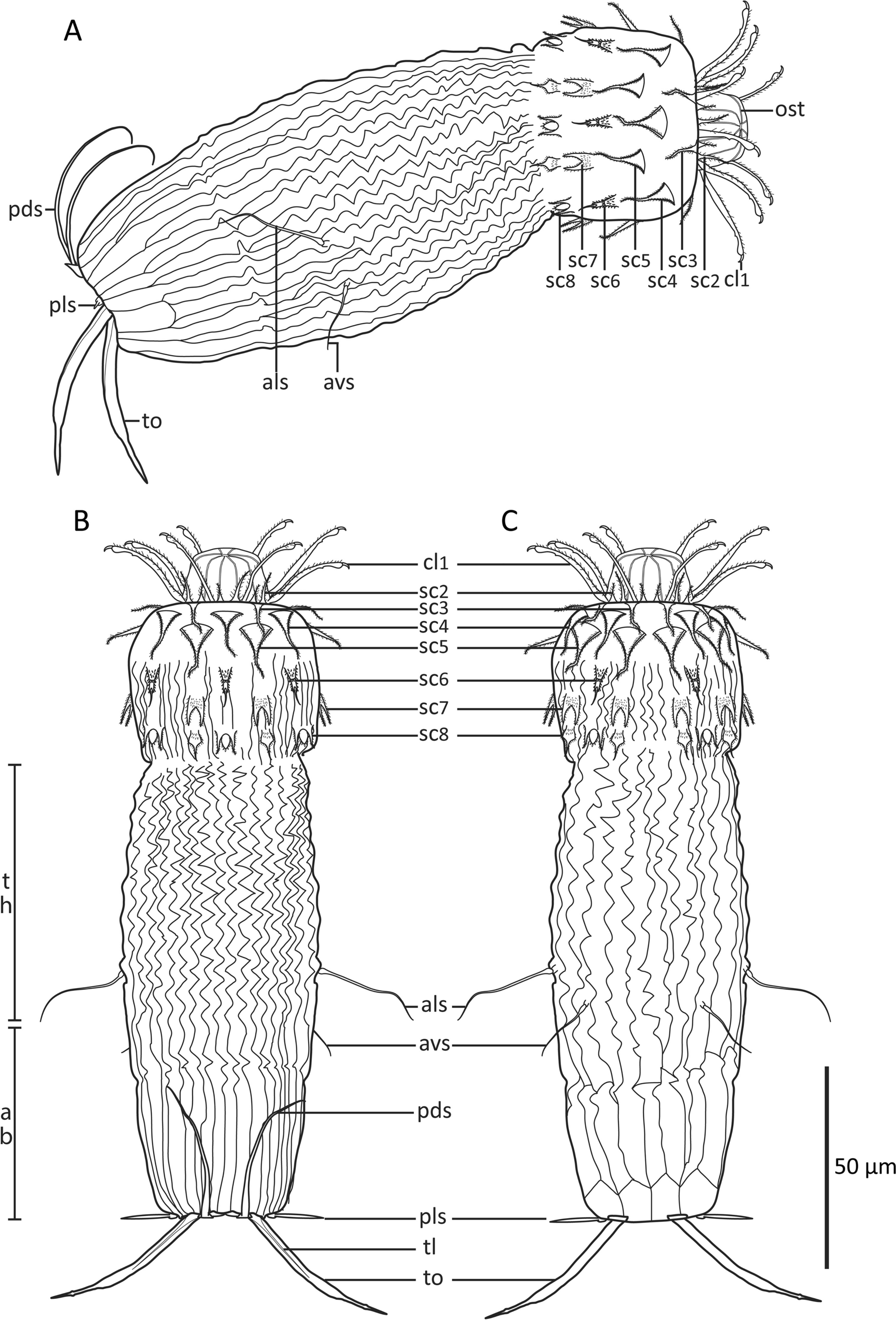
- Line art drawings of Scaberiloricus samba early instar Higgins-larva.

Scientific classification
- Kingdom: Animalia
- Phylum: Loricifera
- Order: Nanaloricida
- Family: Pliciloricidae
- Genus: Scaberiloricus; Sørensen, Herranz, Neves, Kristensen & Garraffoni, 2023

= Scaberiloricus =

Genus of marine invertebrate

Scaberiloricus is a monospecific genus, with its only species being Scaberiloricus samba.

== Taxonomy ==
Scaberiloricus samba was found using the craft R/V^{1} Ocean Stalwart. It collected samples from northwest to southeast. It traveled sideways to the continental shelf of Brazil, between São Sebastião and Rio de Janeiro.

To discover the relationships and species of the specimens found, scientists analyzed it along with 25 other species' Higgins-larvae.

== Etymology ==
Scaberiloricus comes from the Latin scaber-, meaning "rough" and Latin -loricus, meaning "lorica". The name refers to the zigzagged rugae seen in the thorax.

== Traits ==
The features of adults are unknown.

=== Higgins-larvae ===
Some features of this species' Higgins-larvae include:

- Small rounded heads, the front of which are smooth, while the back sides have multiple folds, except for areas with scalids.
- A compressed area behind the head.
- A lengthy trunk^{2}.
- Eight rows of scalids.
- Mouth cone including eight indented lines and teeth.
- Thorax has over 40 zigzagged folds.
- Abdomen with around 20 straighter folds. The abdomen is very slightly shorter than the thorax.
- Of the frontal hair-like structures, one pair is abdominal, while the other is found on the sides.
- Lengthy, thin toes with tips pointed away from the body. The toes are supported by plates connecting them to the body.

==== Scalid rows ====
- The sixth row of scalids^{3} have pointed tips.
- The seventh row of scalids are split into two parts (each scalid is split).
- The eighth row of scalids alternates between scalids split into three parts and scalids with the shape of a kite.

== Notes ==
^1 R/V stands for Research Vessel.

^2 In the phases between molts, the trunk has a similar width to the head.

^3 Rows start counting from the inside to the outside, and are found on the introvert.
