= Robert P. Higgins =

American zoologist and ecologist (1932–2022)

Robert Price Higgins
- Born: October 8, 1932; Denver, Colorado, U.S.
- Died: December 18, 2022 (aged 90); Asheville, North Carolina, U.S.
- Education: University of Colorado Boulder; Duke University
- Spouse: Gwendolyn Litherland (m. 1954)
- Awards: AAAS Fellow
- Scientific career
- Fields: Natural history
- Workplaces: Wake Forest University; Marine Biological Laboratory; National Museum of Natural History; Smithsonian Institution
- Thesis: Morphological, larval, and systematic studies of the Kinorhynchs.
- Author abbrev. (zoology): Higgins

Notes
- https://www.jstor.org/stable/24371875

Robert Price Higgins (October 8, 1932 – December 18, 2022) was an American systematic invertebrate zoologist and ecologist, who specialized in the unusual taxa of kinorhynchs and tardigrades.

== Early life and education ==
Robert P. Higgins was born on October 8, 1932, in Denver, Colorado, to Jay Higgins and Amy E (Gates) Higgins, and he attended South High School in Denver, graduating in 1950. He attended the University of Colorado Boulder where he earned both his bachelor's and master's degrees studying in the laboratory of invertebrate zoologist Robert William Pennak, and on the advice of Pennak, he attended Duke University, as a James W. Duke Fellow, earning his Ph.D. in 1961.

== Career ==
In 1961, Higgins started his career in academia as a faculty member in the Biology Department at Wake Forest University, and in 1968 he had a one-year post-doctoral research position at the Marine Biological Laboratory in the Systematics-Ecology program. In 1969, he joined the Smithsonian Institution in the as a biological oceanographer. Higgins served as Director of the Centre for Mediterranean Marine Classification 1969–1971, Program Director of Limnology and Oceanography, 1971–1974, acting director, International Programme on Environmental Sciences in 1974, Zoologist Superior from 1974 to 1978, and Curator, Department of Invertebrate Zoology, National Museum of Natural History in 1978. Higgins retired from the Smithsonian Institution in 1996.

== Death ==
Higgins died in Asheville, North Carolina on December 18, 2022, at the age of 90.

== Selected publications ==
- 1959: Life history of Macrobiotus islandicus Richters with notes on other tardigrades from Colorado. Transactions of the American Microscopical Society 78(2): pages 137–154. https://doi.org/10.2307/3224022
- 1967: The revival of Macrobiotus areolatus Murray (Tardigrada) from the Cryptobiotic State. Crowe, J.H., & Higgins, R.P. 1967. Transactions of the American Microscopical Society 86(3): pages 286–294.
- 1975: Occurrence of the genus Tanarctus Renaud-Debyser, 1959 in Northeastern Atlantic waters with a description of T. ramazzotti n. sp. (Arthrotardigrada).
- 1983: The Atlantic barrier reef ecosystem at Carrie Bow Cay, Belize, II: Kinorhyncha.
- 1984: A New Family of Arthrotardigrada (Tardigrada: Heterotardigrada) from the Atlantic Coast of Florida, United States
- 1986: New Loricifera from southeastern United States coastal Waters.
- 1988: Introduction to the Study of Meiofauna.

== Taxa and species described by Higgins ==
- Cryptorhagina Higgins, 1968
- Condyloderes Higgins, 1969
- Dracoderidae Higgins & Shirayama, 1990
- Dracoderes Higgins & Shirayama, 1990
- Nanaloricus gwenae Kristensen, Heiner & Higgins, 2007
- Neocentrophyes Higgins, 1969
- Neocentrophyidae Higgins, 1969
- Paracentrophyes Higgins, 1983
- Pliciloricidae Higgins & Kristensen, 1986
- Pliciloricus dubius Higgins & Kristensen, 1986
- Pliciloricus enigmaticus Higgins & Kristensen, 1986
- Pliciloricus gracilis Higgins & Kristensen, 1986
- Pliciloricus orphanus Higgins & Kristensen, 1986
- Pliciloricus profundus Higgins & Kristensen, 1986
- Pliciloricus Higgins & Kristensen, 1986
- Rugiloricus carolinensis Higgins & Kristensen, 1986
- Rugiloricus cauliculus Higgins & Kristensen, 1986
- Rugiloricus ornatus Higgins & Kristensen, 1986
- Rugiloricus Higgins & Kristensen, 1986
- Sphenoderes Higgins, 1969
- Sphenoderes indicus Higgins, 1969
- Zelinkaderes Higgins, 1990
- Zelinkaderidae Higgins, 1990

== Taxa described in honor of Higgins ==
- Parastygarctus higginsi Renaud-Debyser, 1965
- Halicaris higginsi Newell, 1984
- Echinoderes higginsi Huys & Coomans, 1989
- Araphura higginsi Sieg & Dojiri, 1989
- Halicryptus higginsi Shirley & Storch, 1999
- Ptychostomella higginsi Clausen, 2004
- Fissuroderes higginsi Neuhaus & Blasche, 2006
- Typhlamphiascus higginsi Chullasorn 2009
- Isoechiniscoides higginsi (Hallas & Kristensen, 1982)
