= Vinctiplicata =

Scientific classification
- Domain: Eukaryota
- Kingdom: Animalia
- Clade: Scalidophora
- Clade: Vinctiplicata

Phyla
- Loricifera; Priapulida

Proposed clade of ecdysozoan animals

The Vinctiplicata is a clade of Scalidophora uniting the Loricifera and the Priapulida, and representing the sister group to the Kinorhyncha. Its monophyly is supported on morphological grounds, although some molecular studies indicate that the Loricifera may be more closely related to the Nematomorpha.
