= Urnaloricus gadi =

Scientific classification
- Kingdom: Animalia
- Phylum: Loricifera
- Order: Nanaloricida
- Family: Urnaloricidae
- Genus: Urnaloricus
- Species: U. gadi

Binomial name
- Urnaloricus gadi Heiner & Kristensen, 2009

Species of microscopic marine invertebrate

Urnaloricus gadi is a species of microscopic Loricifera. It was discovered in the Faroe Bank (North Atlantic) southwest of the Faroe Islands. It is known for its life cycle, involving a large cyst-like mega-larva, and exclusively undergoing viviparous pedogenetic reproduction in which the mother's offspring consume her from within. This species is considered to lack the typical adult form seen in other Loricifera.

Other species in the genus Urnaloricus are:

- Urnaloricus ibenae Neves 2018

== Distribution ==
This species occurs within the North Atlantic Faroe Banks.
