= Nauplius (journal) =

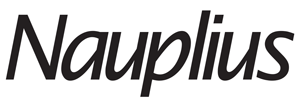
- Discipline: Carcinology
- Language: English
- Edited by: Christopher Tudge

Publication details
- History: 1993–present
- Publisher: Brazilian Crustacean Society (Brazil)
- Open access: Yes
- License: Creative Commons Attribution
- Impact factor: 0.610 (2020)

Standard abbreviations
- ISO 4: Nauplius

Indexing
- ISSN: 0104-6497 (print); 2358-2936 (web)
- OCLC no.: 834416094

Links
- Journal homepage; Online access; Online archive

Nauplius is a peer-reviewed open access scientific journal in the field of carcinology (crustacean research). It is published by the Brazilian Crustacean Society (Sociedade Brasileira de Carcinologia). The editor-in-chief is Christopher Tudge (American University).

== Abstracting and indexing ==
The journal is abstracted and indexed in:

- Aquatic Sciences and Fisheries Abstracts
- Current Contents/Agriculture, Biology & Environmental Sciences
- Science Citation Index Expanded
- The Zoological Record

According to the Journal Citation Reports, the journal has a 2020 impact factor of 0.610.
