= Crustaceana =

- Discipline: Carcinology
- Language: English

Publication details
- History: 1960–present
- Publisher: Brill Publishers
- Frequency: Monthly
- Impact factor: 0.47 (2013)

Standard abbreviations
- ISO 4: Crustaceana

Indexing
- CODEN: CRUSAP
- ISSN: 0011-216X (print); 1568-5403 (web)
- LCCN: 64000354
- JSTOR: 0011216x
- OCLC no.: 01565523

Links
- Journal homepage; Online access

Crustaceana is a peer-reviewed scientific journal specialising in carcinology.

== History ==
Crustaceana was established in 1960 and is published monthly by Brill Publishers. The journal is abstracted and indexed by the Science Citation Index, BIOSIS Previews, The Zoological Record, and GeoRef. According to the Journal Citation Reports, the journal has a 2011 impact factor of 0.464.

The journal is edited by J.C. von Vaupel Klein. It charges an unspecified publication fee from authors of all regular papers, and an optional open access fee of USD 1830.

The journal includes scientific illustrations, including by Carolyn Bartlett Gast.
