= Eolorica =

Eolorica Temporal range: Mid-Cambrian

Scientific classification
- Kingdom: Animalia
- Phylum: Loricifera
- Class: incertae sedis
- Genus: †Eolorica
- Species: †E. deadwoodensis

Binomial name
- †Eolorica deadwoodensis Harvey & Butterfield 2017

Species of tiny marine invertebrate

Eolorica is a fossilized loriciferan from the mid-Cambrian Deadwood Formation of Saskatchewan, Canada, preserved as a Small Carbonaceous Fossil.
