= Fafnirloricus =

Scientific classification
- Kingdom: Animalia
- Phylum: Loricifera
- Order: Nanaloricida
- Family: Nanaloricidae
- Genus: Fafnirloricus; Fujimoto, 2020
- Species: F. polymetallicus

Binomial name
- Fafnirloricus polymetallicus Fujimoto, 2020

Genus of marine invertebrate

Fafnirloricus is a monospecific genus, containing the species Fafnirloricus polymetallicus. It lives in sediment, as the rest of its phylum Loricifera does.

== Taxonomy ==
In 2020, this species of Loricifera was found in the Clarion–Clipperton zone. It was found in sediment on manganese nodules 5223 meters deep.

== Traits ==
An adult male of this species has a ringed cheek tube and brachiated (branched) clavoscalids (club-shaped scalids).

Some unique characteristics of this species that differentiate it include:

- sawlike mouth parts
- a strange formation of scalids
- a lorica (abdomen) with 20 plates and 14 frontal spikes
- it is found very deep in the ocean
