= Titaniloricus =

Scientific classification
- Kingdom: Animalia
- Phylum: Loricifera
- Order: Nanaloricida
- Family: Pliciloricidae
- Genus: Titaniloricus; Gad, 2005
- Species: T. inexpectatovus

Binomial name
- Titaniloricus inexpectatovus Gad, 2005
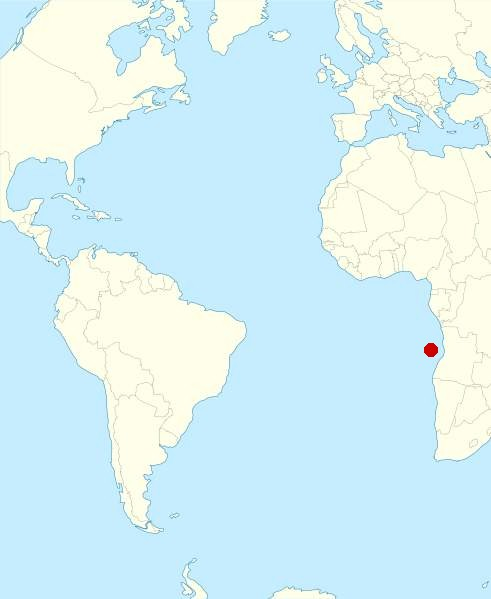
- Type locality of T. inexpectatovus

Genus of tiny marine invertebrates

Titaniloricus is a genus of small marine animal in the phylum Loricifera. It contains a single species, Titaniloricus inexpectatovus, described by Gunnar Gad in 2005. It has been collected from the abyssal plain in Angolan waters of the Atlantic Ocean.

== Etymology ==
The generic name is derived from the Latin words titanis (meaning giant) and titanes (rare), in reference to the relatively large size of the larvae in this genus compared to other Loricifera, and their rarity (the taxon is not known from elsewhere than its type locality). The specific name is derived from the Latin inexspectatus (surprise) and ovum (egg), as the larvae are like chocolate eggs that contain small surprises.

== Description ==
The type series consists mostly of sixth instar Higgins-larvae. These have are relatively large and have a stubby body. The introvert is retracted, the thorax is long and extendable, with many foldable cuticular plates. The lorica is rounded and barrel-like. When the body is fully extended, the animal is expected to measure more than 800 μm.

First instar Higgins-larvae, resembling sixth instar Higgins-larvae but smaller, were found inside the holotype. Also a paedogenetic seventh instar larva, with simplified body, was found inside a sixth instar Higgins-larva.

One adult specimen is tentatively ascribed to this species. The lorica is 140 μm in length and 80 μm in width. The total length is assumed to be about 230 μm, that is, less than the sixth instar Higgins-larva.

== Habitat ==
The type series was collected with a multi-corer from stations at 5,389–5,427 m (17,680–17,805 ft) depth. The samples represent the upper 5 cm of the bottom substrate, well-oxygenated mud.
