= Australoricus =

Scientific classification
- Kingdom: Animalia
- Phylum: Loricifera
- Order: Nanaloricida
- Family: Nanaloricidae
- Genus: Australoricus
- Species: A. oculatus

Binomial name
- Australoricus oculatus Heiner, Boesgaard & Kristensen, 2009

Genus of tiny marine invertebrates

Australoricus oculatus is a species of Loricifera, a species of microscopic marine sediment-dwelling animals, in the family Nanaloricidae. It is the only described species in the genus Australoricus. It was discovered in sea caves off New South Wales in Australia.
