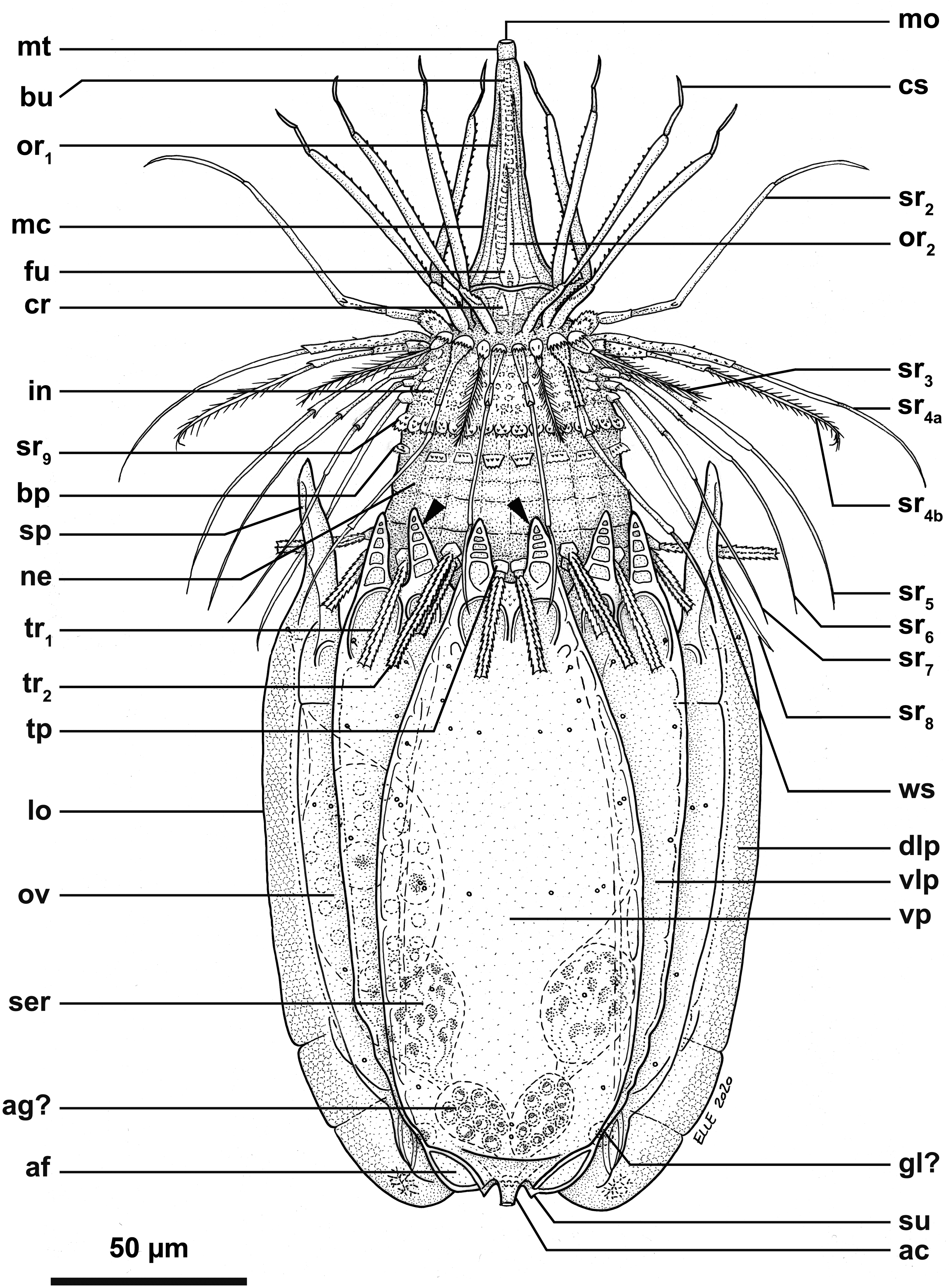
- Line drawing of adult female Scutiloricus hugoi

Scientific classification
- Kingdom: Animalia
- Phylum: Loricifera
- Order: Nanaloricida
- Family: Nanaloricidae
- Genus: Scutiloricus; Neves, Kristensen & Møbjerg, 202
- Species: S. hugoi

Binomial name
- Scutiloricus hugoi Neves, Kristensen & Møbjerg, 2021

= Scutiloricus =

Genus of marine invertebrates

Scutiloricus is a monospecific genus, with its only species being Scutiloricus hugoi.

== Taxonomy ==
Scutiloricus hugoi was collected from clean shell gravel on the coast of Roscoff, France in Trezen ar Skoden. This species was separated from other specimens under a microscope.

== Traits ==
Adult Scutiloricus hugoi are characterized by:

- A square lorica (abdomen) made up of six plates with 14 frontal spikes. Of the 14 spikes, 12 appear as though they have perforations due to having ridges.
- At the back of its lorica, there is a small anal cone (ac in the image) surrounded on either side by two spurs (su in the image).

Something that has not been seen in the rest of Loricifera is receptacles for semen in adult females.

The female chosen as an example for the species was 240 μm long and 83 μm wide.
