= Wataloricus =

Scientific classification
- Kingdom: Animalia
- Phylum: Loricifera
- Order: Nanaloricida
- Family: Pliciloricidae
- Genus: Wataloricus; Fujimoto, Yamasaki, Kimura, Ohtsuka & Kristensen, 2020

Genus of marine invertebrates

Wataloricus is a monospecific genus. Its only species is Wataloricus japonicus.

== Taxonomy ==
Wataloricus japonicus was found in near Japan in the Northwest Pacific. It was classified as being in Pliciloricidae.

== Traits ==
Some characteristics of this species which differentiate it from others within Pliciloricidae include:

=== Adults ===
- Long, solid mouth tube with an membrane at its end shaped like an umbrella.
- Two identical organs, each with a spinoscalid.
- 15 trichoscalids (thin wikt:scalids).
- 46 vertical plicae overall.

=== Higgins-larvae ===
- Clavoscalids (club-shaped) with pointed ends.
- Second row of scalids^{1} are spinoscalids.
- Many wrinkles on the thorax.
- Two pairs of hair-like structures on the front and back each.
- Long, thin toes.

== Notes ==
^1 Rows start counting from the inside to the outside, and are found on the introvert.
