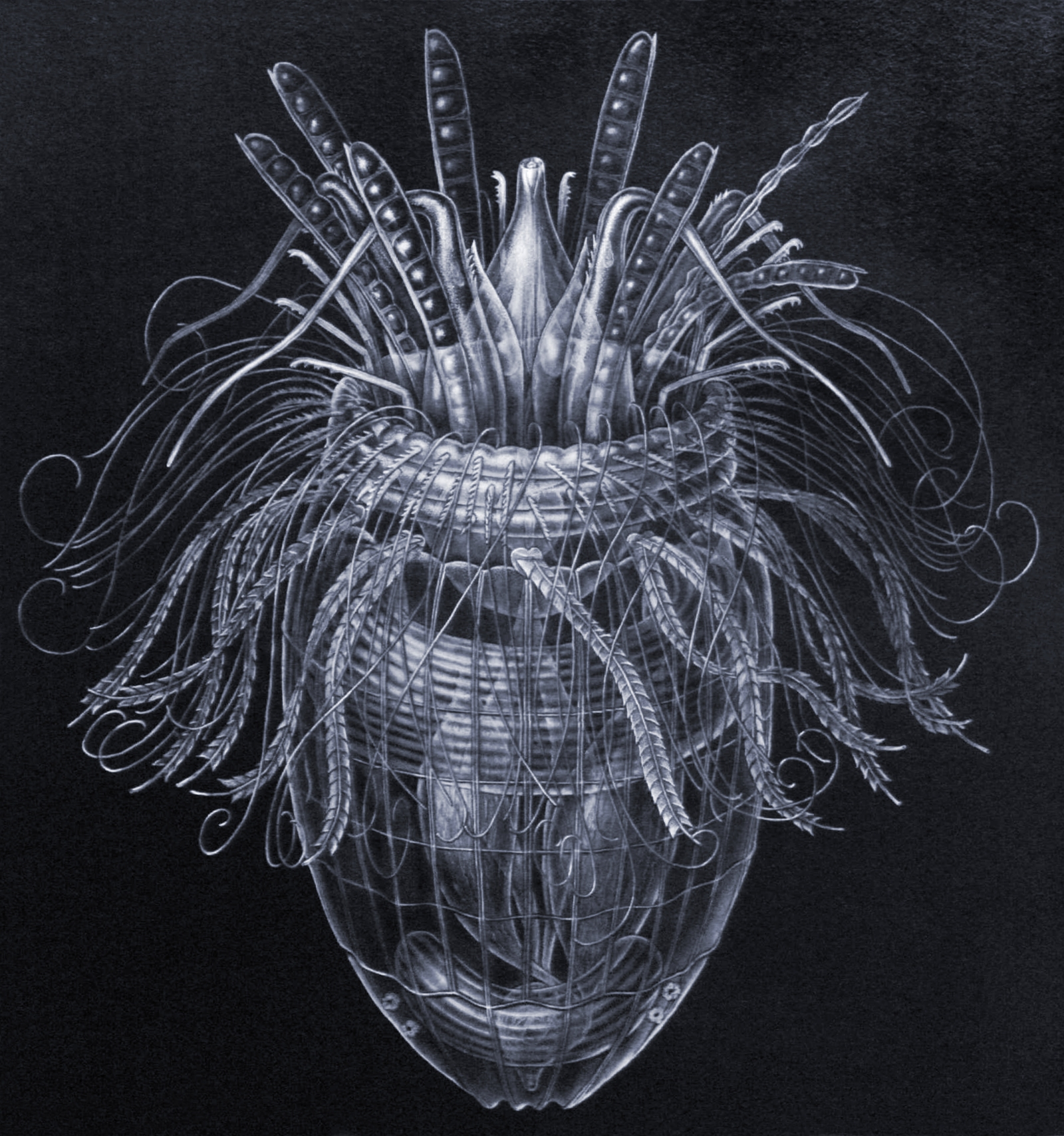
- Pliciloricus enigmaticus (Higgins & Kristensen, 1986), illustration by Carolyn Bartlett Gast

Scientific classification
- Kingdom: Animalia
- Phylum: Loricifera
- Order: Nanaloricida
- Family: Pliciloricidae
- Genus: Pliciloricus
- Species: P. enigmaticus

Binomial name
- Pliciloricus enigmaticus Higgins & Kristensen (1986)
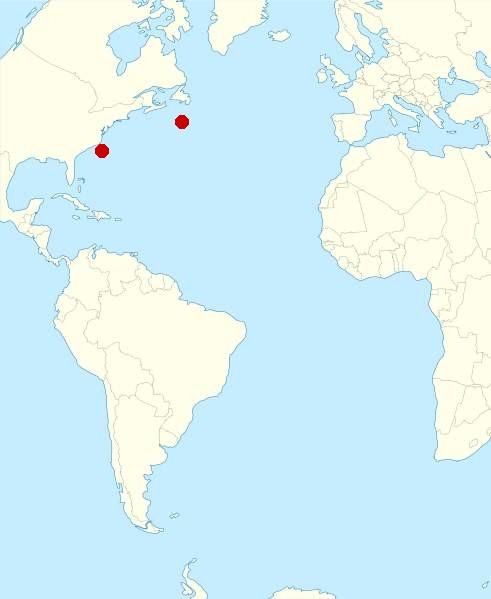
- Distribution of Pliciloricus enigmaticus

= Pliciloricus enigmaticus =

Species of tiny marine invertebrate

Pliciloricus enigmaticus is a marine Loriciferan species of genus Pliciloricus first described by Higgins & Kristensen 1986.

== Description ==
Pliciloricus enigmaticus is a marine species in which adults measure between 160–268 μm of length (excluding any cone mouth).

The body is dual compound, located in the second row spinoscalids in position medioventral and lies fused in the middle of its length basal. It usually is very modified, strongly sclerotised, and rigid. The 15 spinoscalids have claws in the third row. Spinoscalids with 4–7 teeth that alternate with spinoscalids that are not modified.

The Lorica features 7 ridges cuticular transverse and longitudinal ridges doubles, 2 plates lateroventral of the caudal region. The anus is terminal.

== Distribution ==
The species name Pliciloricus enigmaticus has so far only been used for animals found in the northwestern Atlantic Ocean: Two finds off the eastern shore of North America (see map, right).

== See also ==
- family Pliciloricidae
- phylum Loricifera
