= Nanaloricus mysticus =

Scientific classification
- Kingdom: Animalia
- Phylum: Loricifera
- Order: Nanaloricida
- Family: Nanaloricidae
- Genus: Nanaloricus
- Species: N. mysticus

Binomial name
- Nanaloricus mysticus Kristensen, 1983

Species of marine invertebrate

Nanaloricus mysticus is a species within the genus Nanaloricus. It was the first species of the phylum Loricifera, described by Reinhardt Møbjerg Kristensen in 1983.

== Taxonomy ==
The species was collected from three places.

1. From the surface layer of shell gravel close to Roscoff, France at a depth of 25-30 meters.
2. Close to the Azores Islands 480 meters deep.
3. Six miles east of Fort Pierce, Florida, 15 meters deep.

== Traits ==
Adult males are 227-235 μm long, while adult females are 230-235 μm long.

- Females have two partitioned clavoscalids (club-shaped scalids). The first of these segments include rounded outward lumps, and the tip of the second segment is pointed.
- Males have two abdominal clavoscalids and three more pairs of clavoscalids on their back.
