= Urnaloricus =

Scientific classification
- Kingdom: Animalia
- Phylum: Loricifera
- Order: Nanaloricida
- Family: Urnaloricidae
- Genus: Urnaloricus; Heiner & Kristensen, 2009

Type species
- Urnaloricus gadi Heiner & Kristensen, 2009

Other species
- Urnaloricus ibenae

Genus of tiny marine invertebrates

Urnaloricus is a genus of loricifera; it is distinct enough to belong to its own family, Urnaloricidae. Loricifera are a phylum of animals that live in marine areas only, and are very small in size. The Urnaloricus was found Southwest in the Faroe Islands, North Atlantic. It was the thirty-eighth loriciferan species found. One part of the life cycle is the Higgins larva and it is introverted with eight two-segmented clavoscalids.

The genus includes:

- Urnaloricus gadi Heiner & Kristensen, 2009
- Urnaloricus ibenae Neves, 2018
