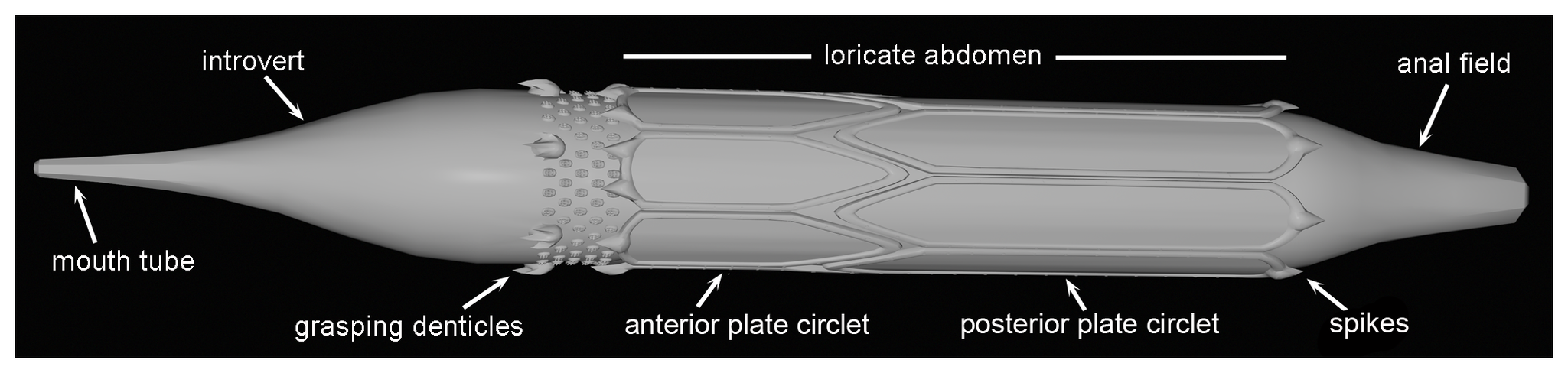
- Sirilorica

Scientific classification
- Kingdom: Animalia
- Stem group: Loricifera
- Genus: Sirilorica; Peel 2010

Species
- S. carlsbergi Peel 2010; S. pustulosa Peel 2010

= Sirilorica =

Sirilorica Temporal range: Cambrian Stage 3

Extinct genus of worm-like animals

Sirilorica is a genus of stem-group loriciferan from the Sirius Passet.

== Morphology ==
Sirilorica was a worm-like animal ranging from three to eight centimetres in length.

== Ecology ==
Sirilorica probably burrowed on the sediment surface, although since it is never preserved alongside burrows the fossils were presumably washed to their final resting places.

== Affinity ==
The loricate plates align the animal with the Loricifera.

== Etymology ==
Its generic name reflects its origin in the Sirius passet, and its loricate appearance. The specific epithet of one species, carlsbergi honours the Carlsberg Foundation's financial contribution to Sirius Passet research.
