= Culexiregiloricus =

Scientific classification
- Kingdom: Animalia
- Phylum: Loricifera
- Order: Nanaloricida
- Family: Nanaloricidae
- Genus: Culexiregiloricus; Gad, 2009

Genus of corset animals

Culexiregiloricus is a monospecific genus, with the species Culexiregiloricus trichiscalida. Like its phylum, it lives in argillaceous sediment.

== Taxonomy ==
In the spring of 2005, the sample in which the species was found in was taken from a depth of 4,141 meters from the Guinea Basin. The top five centimeters of the sample were taken along with the water directly on top of it. The water was filtered through a 40 μm netting. The meiobenthos^{1} were acquired through differential flotation. Levasil, a gelatinous silica gel was added, then centrifugal force separated them. It was spun at 4,000 rpm, then species were classified morphologically.

== Traits ==
=== Mouth ===
This species is characterized by its long mouth tube. It also has a short mouth cone.

=== Scalids ===
The second and third rows of scalids (threadlike parts that extend from the introvert) are covered with hair like structures.

=== Lorica ===
The lorica (abdomen) is divided into eight plates. Six of these are wide, and two are thin. The lorica has fourteen spikes.

=== Caudal end ===
The lowest part of its body has a wide abdominal plate. It is surrounded on either side by large elevated cuticular ridges.

== Notes ==
^1 The animals at the bottom of the ocean/sea that are larger than microfauna and smaller than macrofauna.
