= Armorloricus =

Scientific classification
- Kingdom: Animalia
- Phylum: Loricifera
- Order: Nanaloricida
- Family: Nanaloricidae
- Genus: Armorloricus; Kristensen & Gad 2004

Species
- A. davidi Kristensen & Gad 2004; A. elegans Kristensen & Gad 2004; A. kristenseni Kristensen & Gad 2004

Genus of tiny marine invertebrates

Armorloricus is a genus of nanaloricate loriciferans, small to microscopic marine sediment-dwelling animals.

== Species ==
Three described species.

1. Armorloricus davidi Kristensen & Gad, 2004
2. Armorloricus elegans Kristensen & Gad, 2004
3. Armorloricus kristenseni Heiner, 2004

Typical characteristics of this genus include smooth lorica (armor that covers their body) with large midventral and laterodorsal plates, very long and narrow mouth tube, etc.

== Gallery ==
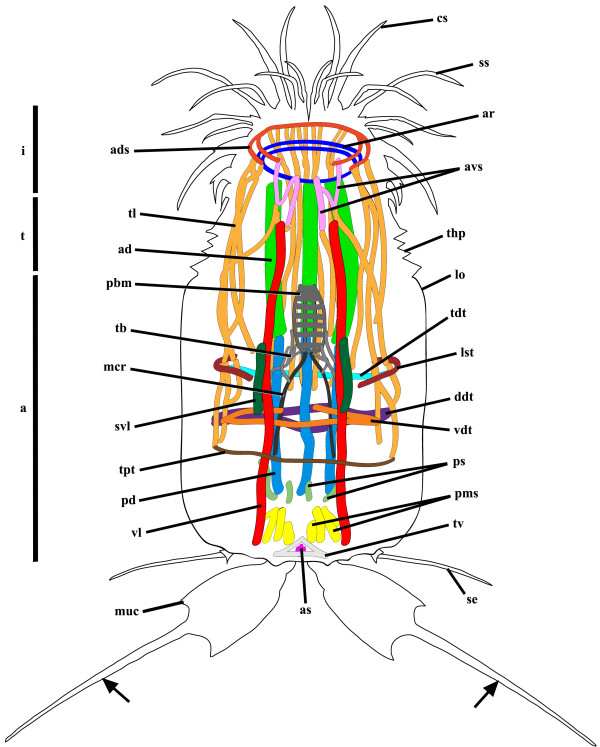
Schematic of A. elegans

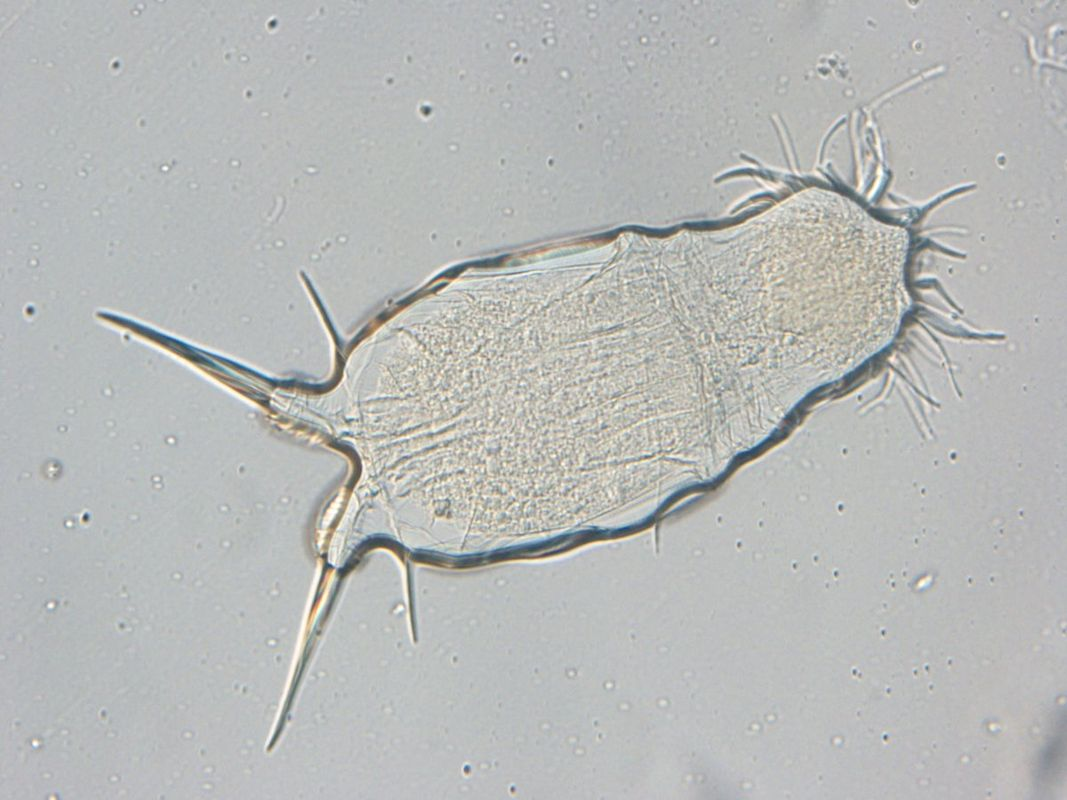
Image of A. davidi

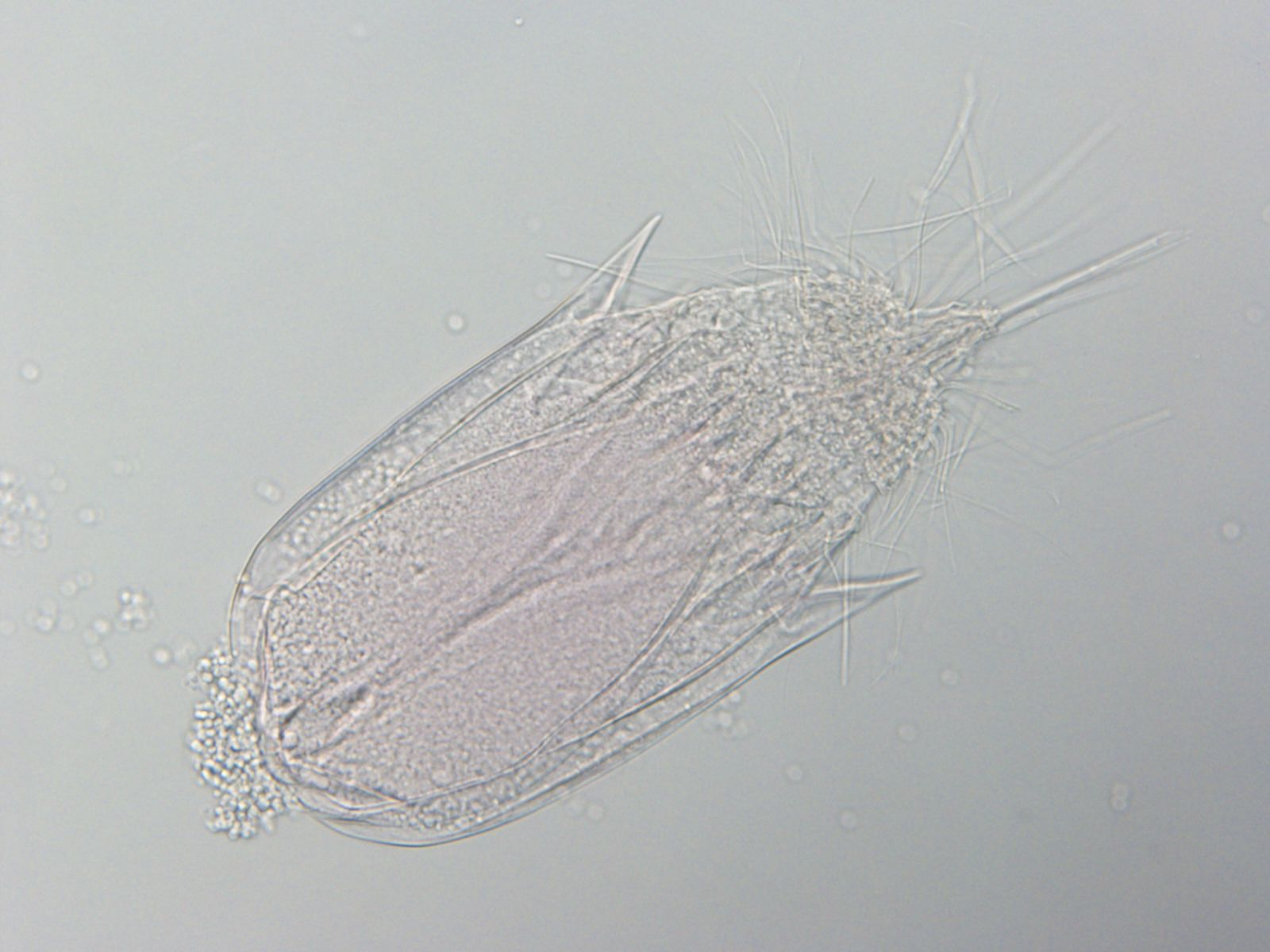
Image of A. kristenseni
