= Phoeniciloricus =

Scientific classification
- Kingdom: Animalia
- Phylum: Loricifera
- Order: Nanaloricida
- Family: Nanaloricidae
- Genus: Phoeniciloricus; Gad, 2004
- Species: P. simplidigitatus

Binomial name
- Phoeniciloricus simplidigitatus Gad, 2004

Genus of tiny marine invertebrates

Phoeniciloricus is a monospecific genus of loriciferans, a phylum of small marine sediment-dwelling animals. Its one species is Phoeniciloricus simplidigitatus.
