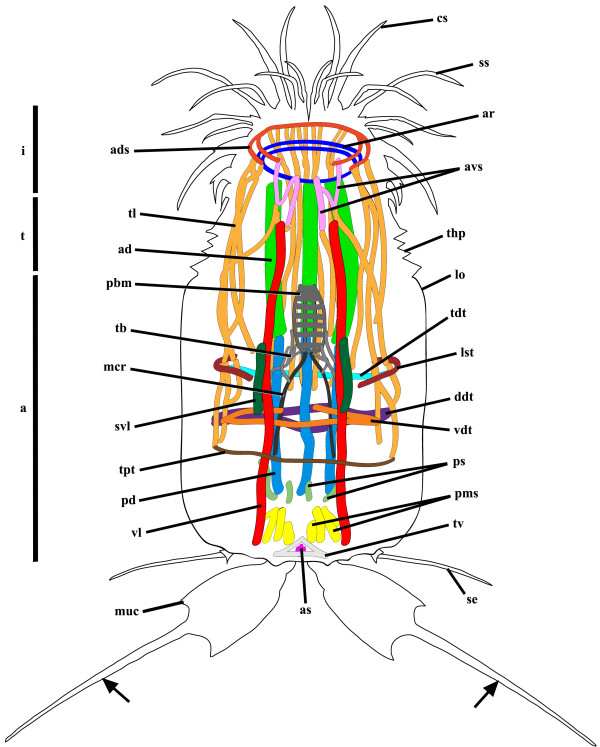
- A schematic drawing of an Armorloricus elegans larva with a retracted mouth

Scientific classification
- Kingdom: Animalia
- Phylum: Loricifera
- Order: Nanaloricida
- Family: Nanaloricidae
- Genus: Armorloricus
- Species: A. elegans

Binomial name
- Armorloricus elegans Kristensen & Gad, 2004

= Armorloricus elegans =

Species of loriciferan

Armorloricus elegans is a nanaloricate loriciferan and one of the three species within Armorloricus. It is found in the surface layer of shell gravel at a depth of 50-55 meters. It is—like its phylum (Loricifera)—small or microscopic. Adults have smooth lorica, meaning a smooth outer covering which acts as armor. It has (relatively) large midventral and laterodorsal plates, which are seen connecting its lorica to its mouth tube. It has a lengthy but narrow mouth tube.

Armorloricus elegans is the type species of its genus.

Many of its traits are shared by other species within the genus.

== Traits ==
The dorsal plate of the lorica is divided lengthwise into three parts.

A medium-sized male holotype of the species is 340 μm long. In the middle of the lorica the maximum length of the trunk was found to be 118 μm. For the female allotype, the respective measurements are 300 μm and 120 μm. Postlarva are 300 μm in length and their maximum lorica diameter was 116 μm.

The toes and lorica of this species are made of a honeycomb structure.

In the picture, the mucrones are the parts at the bottom. There are two of them, one on each side, and they are end pointed away from the body with narrow tips.

This species is part of Loricifera, therefore, in its adulthood, it is made up of a mouth cone, introvert (the part in between the mouth cone and neck which has the scalids^{1}), neck, thorax, and lorica (abdomen) and is symmetrical.

The clavoscalids^{2} are the first (innermost) row of scalids. They are labeled as CS (the uppermost label) in the picture, and the male ones^{3} are claval.

The other scalids are known as spinoscalids. In Higgins-larvae, spinoscalids are spiny or unciferous (hooklike)^{4}.

This species has displayed sexual dimorphism. Males have two clavoscalids which aren't present in females.

This species can retract itself into its lorica (abdomen).

== Notes ==
^1 The scalids have a filiform (threadlike) structure. They can be seen in the image at the top, labeled with CS (clavoscalids) and SS (spinoscalids). The first (innermost) row of scalids are clavoscalids and the rest are spinoscalids.

^2 The clavoscalids got their name from being claval. Clavo- as in claval. Claval means club-shaped.

^3 The female ones are spiny and aren't branchiose (they don't branch out).

^4 Unciferous means hooklike (shaped like a hook).
