= Tenuiloricus =

Scientific classification
- Kingdom: Animalia
- Phylum: Loricifera
- Class: incertae sedis
- Genus: Tenuiloricus; Neves & Kristensen, 2014
- Species: T. shirayamai

Binomial name
- Tenuiloricus shirayamai Neves & Kristensen, 2014

Genus of tiny marine invertebrates

Tenuiloricus is a monospecific genus of loriciferans known from its larval form, and occupying an uncertain taxonomic position.

== Species ==
- Species Tenuiloricus shirayamai Neves & Kristensen, 2014
