= Nanaloricus =

Scientific classification
- Kingdom: Animalia
- Phylum: Loricifera
- Order: Nanaloricida
- Family: Nanaloricidae
- Genus: Nanaloricus; Kristensen, 1983

Type species
- Nanaloricus mysticus Kristensen, 1983

Species
- N. gwenae Kristensen, Heiner & Higgins, 2007; N. khaitatus Todaro & Kristensen, 1998; N. mathildeae Neves, Kristensen & Møbjerg, 2021; N. mysticus Kristensen, 1983; N. valdemari Neves, Kristensen & Møbjerg, 2021

Genus of tiny marine invertebrates

Nanaloricus is a genus of loriciferan, the first to be described.

== Species ==
Nanaloricus has five species

- Nanaloricus gwenae Kristensen, Heiner & Higgins, 2007
- Nanaloricus khaitatus Todaro & Kristensen, 1998
- Nanaloricus mathildeae Neves, Kristensen & Møbjerg, 2021
- Nanaloricus mysticus Kristensen, 1983
- Nanaloricus valdemari Neves, Kristensen & Møbjerg, 2021
