= Patuloricus =

Scientific classification
- Kingdom: Animalia
- Phylum: Loricifera
- Class: incertae sedis
- Genus: Patuloricus; Sørensen, Grzelak, and Kristensen & Herranz, 2022
- Species: P. tangaroa

Binomial name
- Patuloricus tangaroa Sørensen, Grzelak, and Kristensen & Herranz, 2022

Genus of loriciferan

Patuloricus is a monospecific genus of loriciferan that occupies an uncertain taxonomic position, its only species being Patuloricus tangaroa. It was first described by Sørensen, Grzelak, and Kristensen and Herranz in 2022.

== Taxonomy ==
Patuloricus tangaroa was the first found in New Zealand. They were described on the Bay of Plenty. The samples of sediment were taken in April 2012. It is the second species of Loricifera to have a Shira larva. After the Shira larva, the next stage is known as postlarva.

== Etymology ==
Patuloricus comes from the Maori patu-, meaning "patu"; and Latin -loricus, meaning "lorica".

== Traits ==
=== Shira larvae ===
- Large spherical heads.
- Six rows of scalids.
- Trunk with many folds, a long thorax (Note: The trunk is around double the length of the abdomen.) and short abdomen.

The organism chosen as an example for measurements for the species measured 218 μm long and 75 μm wide, with its head being its widest point.

==== Scalids ====
The Shira larvae of this species have six rows of scalids. Rows count from the inside to the outside.

- The first and most frontal row has eight clavoscalids (club-shaped scalids).
- The second row has 16 scalids in eight pairs.
- The third row has eight hook-like scalids connected to the body with rectangular plates.
- The fourth row has seven scalids, three pairs and one attached to the body in the middle of the back. These are connected by an oval-shaped plate.
- The fifth row has eight scalids.
- The sixth row has fifteen scalids.

=== Postlarvae ===
- Large spherical heads with nothing attached on top of them.
- A very long, thin trunk with many muscles.
- Head has retractor muscles.
