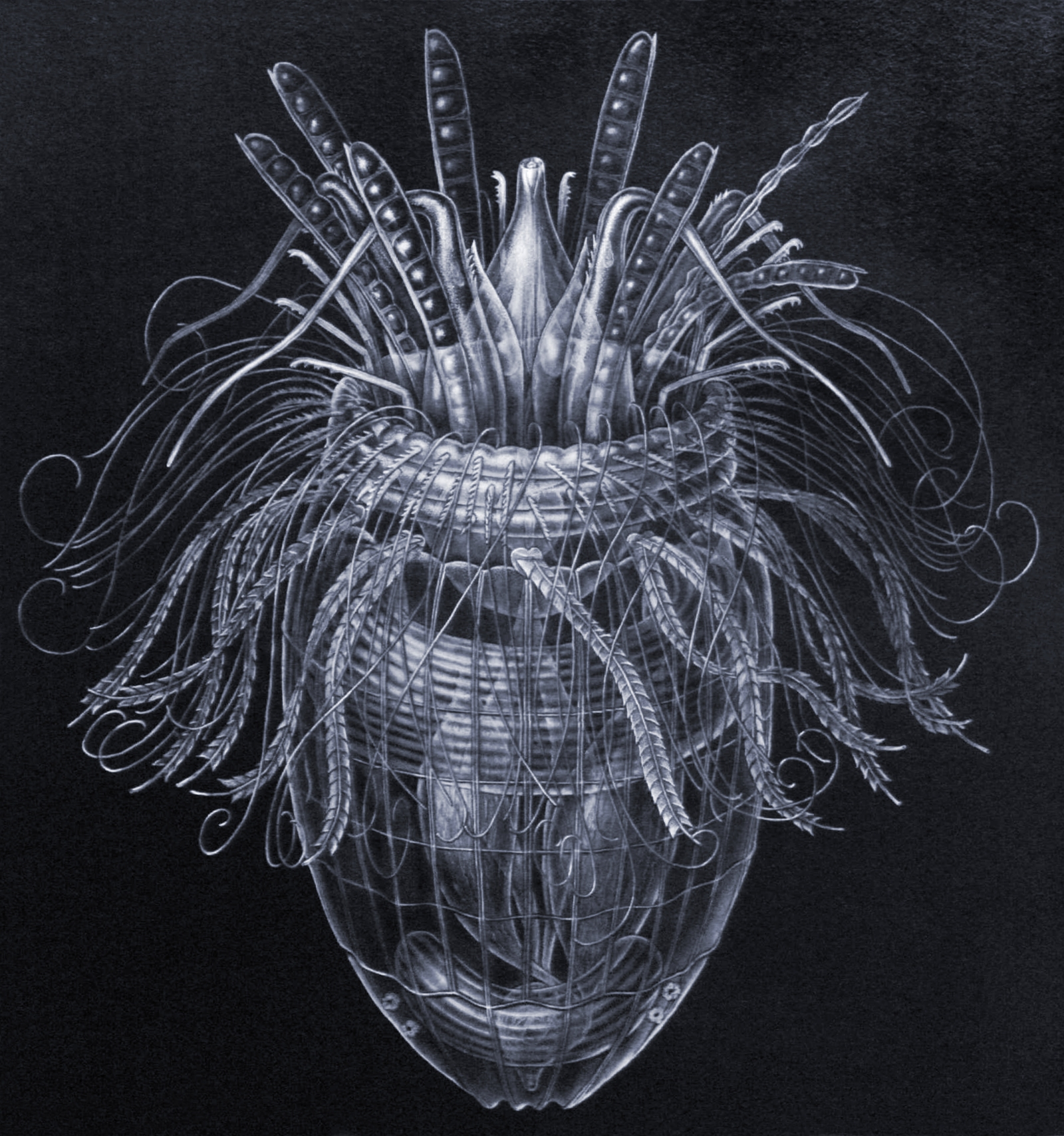
- Pliciloricus enigmaticus Higgins & Kristensen, 1986, illustration by Carolyn Bartlett Gast

Scientific classification
- Kingdom: Animalia
- Phylum: Loricifera
- Order: Nanaloricida
- Family: Pliciloricidae
- Genus: Pliciloricus; Higgins & Kristensen, 1986.

= Pliciloricus =

Genus of tiny marine invertebrates

Pliciloricus is a genus of marine organisms Pliciloricidae family, the phylum Loricifera described by Higgins & Kristensen, 1986.

== Species ==
- Pliciloricus cavernicola Heiner, Boesgaard & Kristensen, 2009
- Pliciloricus corvus Gad, 2005
- Pliciloricus diva Gad, 2009
- Pliciloricus ferox Gad, 2009
- Pliciloricus dubius Higgins & Kristensen, 1986
- Pliciloricus enigmaticus Higgins & Kristensen, 1986
- Pliciloricus gracilis Higgins & Kristensen, 1986
- Pliciloricus hadalis Kristensen & Shirayama, 1988
- Pliciloricus leocaudatus Heiner & Kristensen, 2005
- Pliciloricus orphanus Higgins & Kristensen, 1986
- Pliciloricus pedicularis Gad, 2005
- Pliciloricus profundus Higgins & Kristensen, 1986
- Pliciloricus senicirrus Gad, 2005
- Pliciloricus shukeri Heiner & Kristensen, 2005
