= Carolyn Bartlett Gast =

American scientific illustrator

- Born: April 30, 1929; Cambridge, Massachusetts, United States
- Died: c. September 2015
- Education: Boston University
- Known for: scientific illustration

Carolyn Bartlett Gast (April 30, 1929 – c. September 2015) was an American scientific illustrator. She is most known for her illustration is of the loriciferan phylum Pliciloricus enigmatus.

== Early life and education ==
Gast was born in Cambridge, Massachusetts. She studied book illustrating at Boston University and spent a year training and drafting for the Army Map Service.

== Career ==
Gast worked at the Departments of Vertebrate and Invertebrate Zoology at the Smithsonian National Museum of Natural History, Washington D.C., from 1954 to 1985. She was a scientific illustrator who used a stereoscopic microscope to make two-dimensional drawings of specimens.

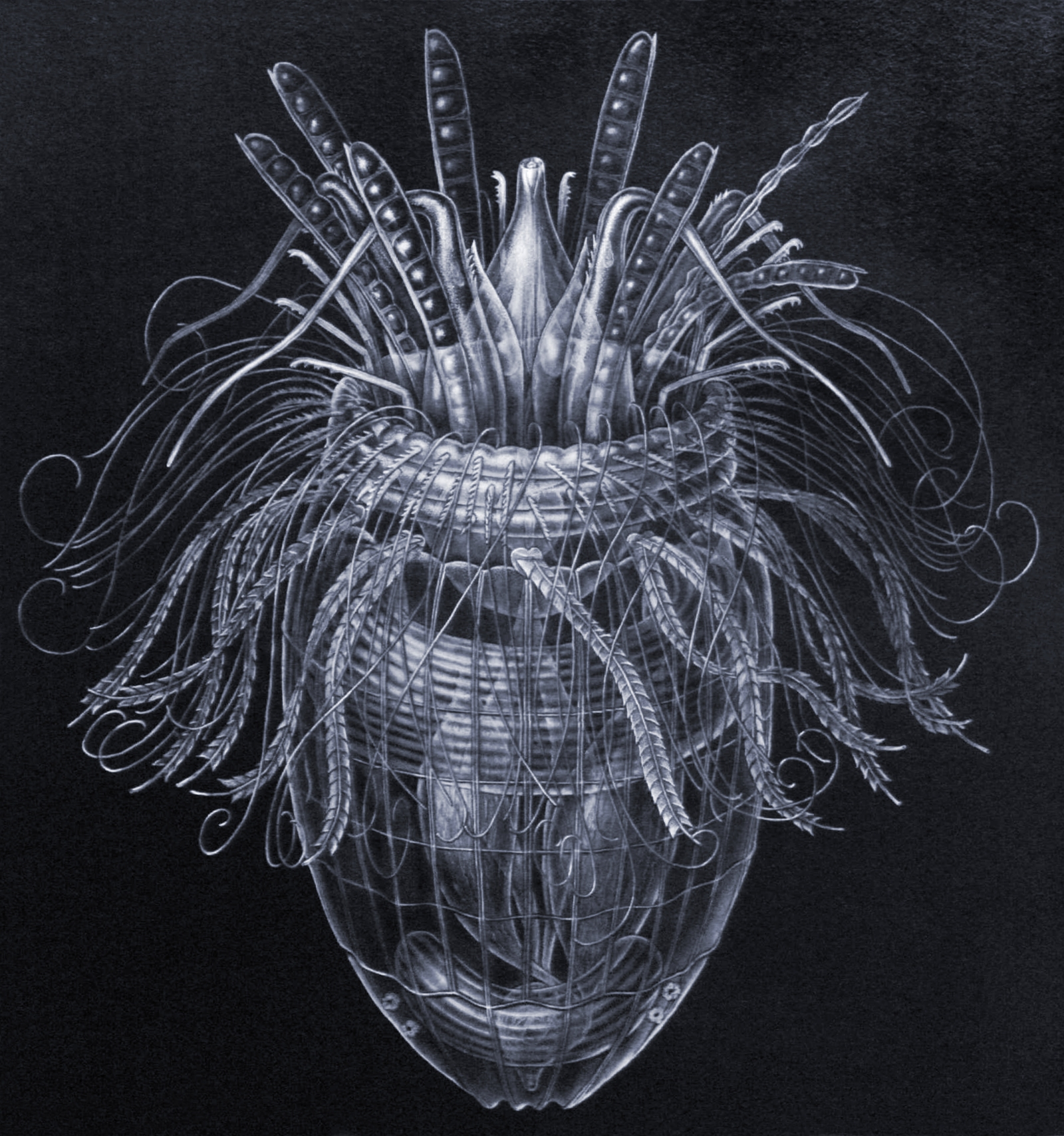
Illustration of the loriciferan phylum Pliciloricus enigmatus by Gast for a 1986 Smithsonian report titled New Loricifera from Southeastern United States Coastal Waters

Her most well known and reproduced illustration is of the loriciferan phylum Pliciloricus enigmatus, which was discovered in 1983 by the Danish biologist Reinhardt Møbjerg Kristensen in the microscopic ecosystem between grains of sand. She was also credited for providing illustrations in publications such as the academic journal Crustaceana.

Gast was founder of the Guild of Natural Science Illustrators in 1968, and contributed two chapters to The Guild Handbook of Scientific Illustration. She invented an ultra mini-vacuum cleaner that could be held in one hand for taking excess carbon dust from the illustration board.

In 1984, the National Museum of Natural History held an exhibition of 80 of Gast's works, including illustrations of fossils, fish, insects and invertebrates. She retired a year later, in 1985.

Outside of her scientific work, Gast was also interested in medieval illuminated manuscripts and created a three-dimensional alphabet in this style.

She died in 2015.
