= Rugiloricus =

Scientific classification
- Kingdom: Animalia
- Phylum: Loricifera
- Order: Nanaloricida
- Family: Pliciloricidae
- Genus: Rugiloricus; Higgins & Kristensen, 1986.

Genus of tiny marine invertebrates

Rugiloricus is a genus of marine organisms of the phylum Loricifera and the family Pliciloricidae, described by Higgins & Kristensen in 1986.

== Species ==
- Rugiloricus bacatus Heiner 2008
- Rugiloricus californiensis Neves et al. 2018
- Rugiloricus carolinensis Higgins & Kristensen, 1986
- Rugiloricus bacatus Heiner, 2008
- Rugiloricus cauliculus Higgins & Kristensen, 1986
- Rugiloricus doliolius Gad, 2005
- Rugiloricus manuelae Pardos & Kristensen, 2013
- Rugiloricus ornatus Higgins & Kristensen, 1986
- Rugiloricus polaris Gad & Arbizu, 2005
- Rugiloricus renaudae Kristensen, Neves & Gad, 2013
