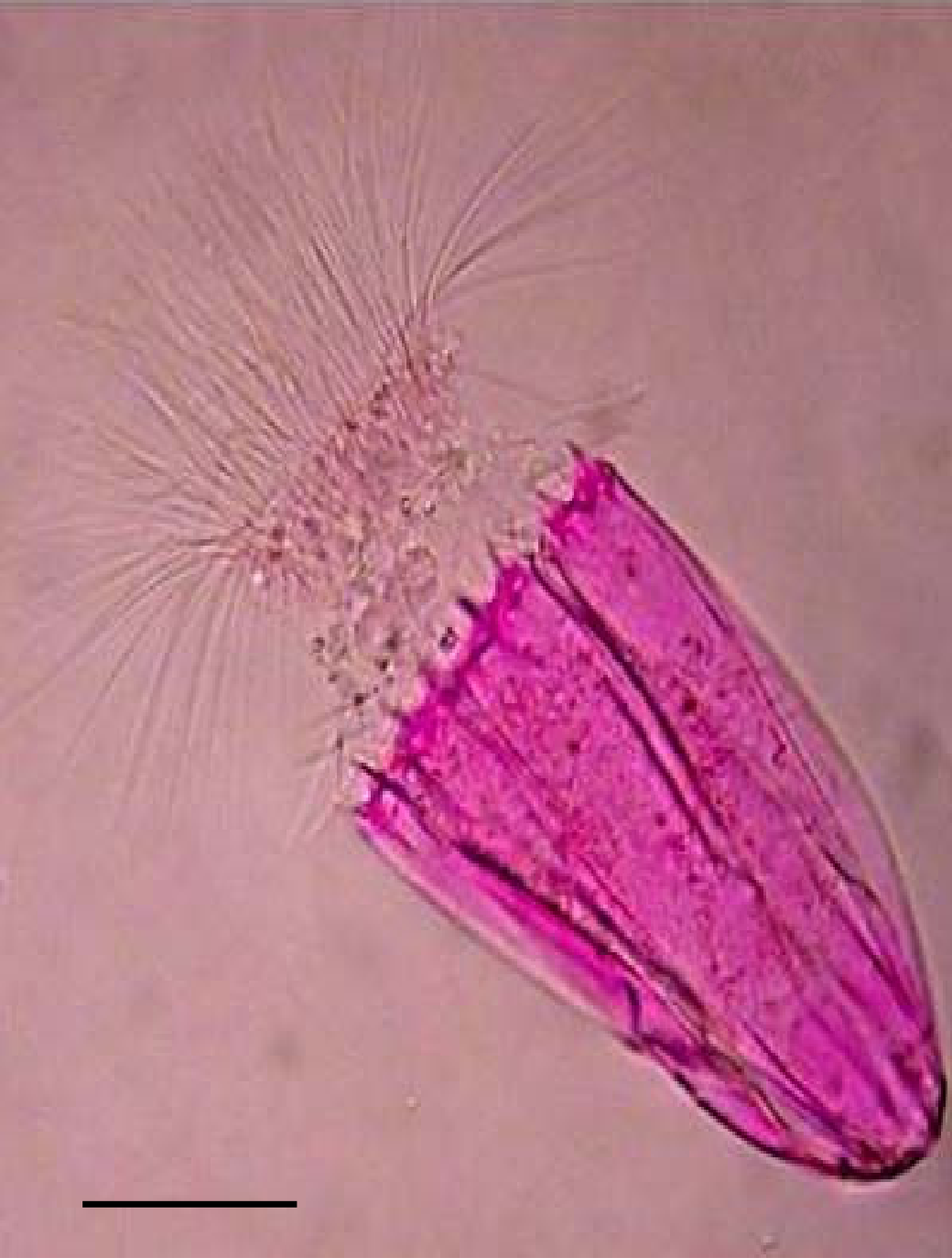
- Spinoloricus cinziae

Scientific classification
- Kingdom: Animalia
- Phylum: Loricifera
- Order: Nanaloricida
- Family: Nanaloricidae
- Genus: Spinoloricus; Heiner, 2007

Type species
- Spinoloricus turbatio Heiner & Neuhaus 2007

Species
- Spinoloricus cinziae Neves et al. 2014; Spinoloricus turbatio Heiner & Neuhaus 2007

= Spinoloricus =

Genus of tiny marine invertebrates

Spinoloricus is a genus of nanaloricid loriciferans. Its type species is S. turbatio, described in 2007, and another species, native to completely anoxic environment, Spinoloricus cinziae, was described in 2014.
