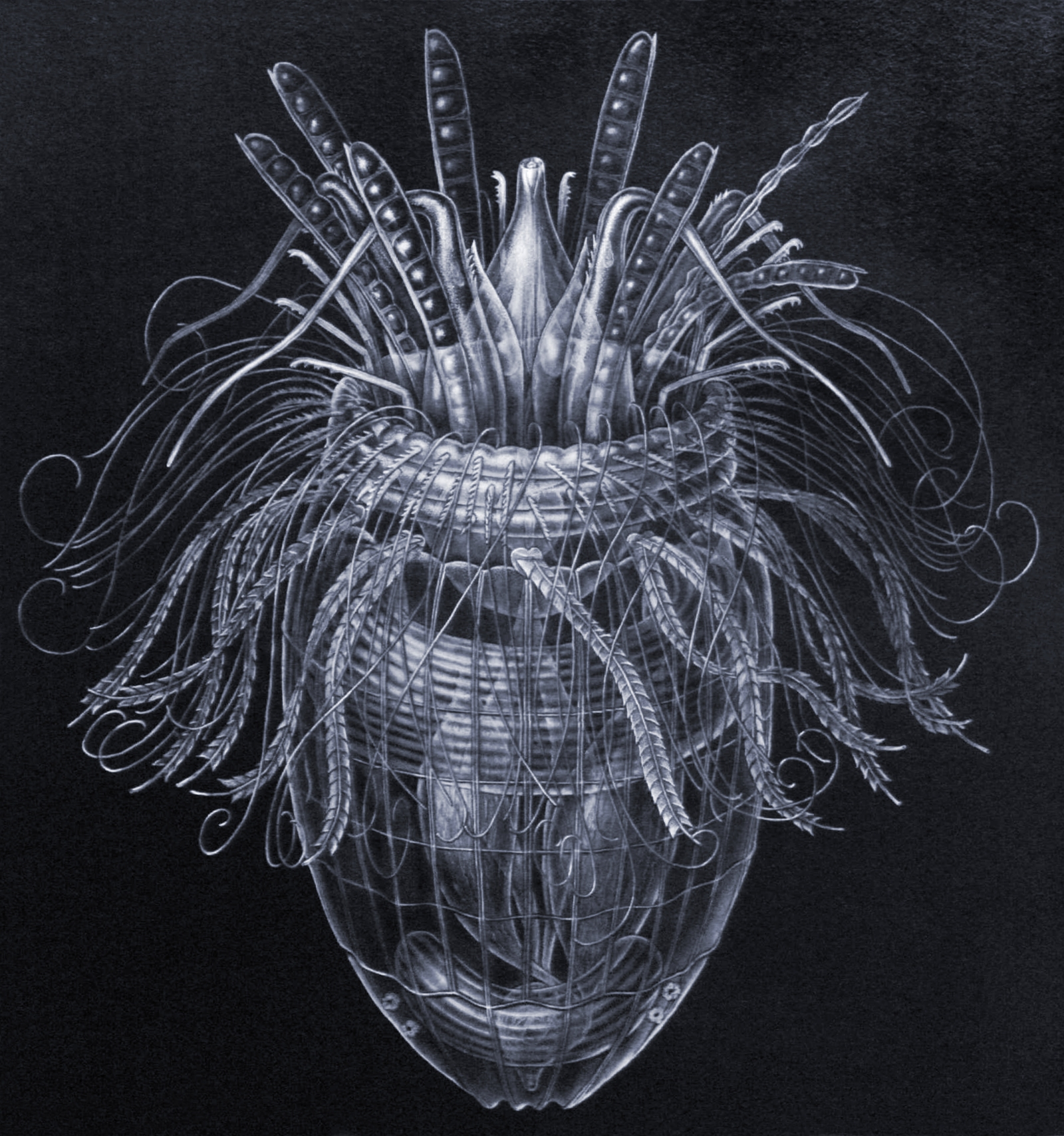
- Pliciloricus enigmaticus Higgins & Kristensen, 1986, illustration by Carolyn Bartlett Gast

Scientific classification
- Kingdom: Animalia
- Phylum: Loricifera
- Order: Nanaloricida
- Family: Pliciloricidae; Higgins & Kristensen, 1986.

Genera
- 4 genera, see text

= Pliciloricidae =

Family of tiny marine invertebrates

Pliciloricidae are a family of marine organisms in the phylum Loricifera. It contains 23 species in 4 genera.

== Traits ==
Pliciloricids generally have plicae on their loricas.

== Genera ==
- Pliciloricus Higgins & Kristensen, 1986
- Rugiloricus Higgins & Kristensen, 1986
- Titaniloricus Gad, 2005
- Wataloricus Fujimoto, Yamasaki, Kimura, Ohtsuka & Kristensen, 2020
