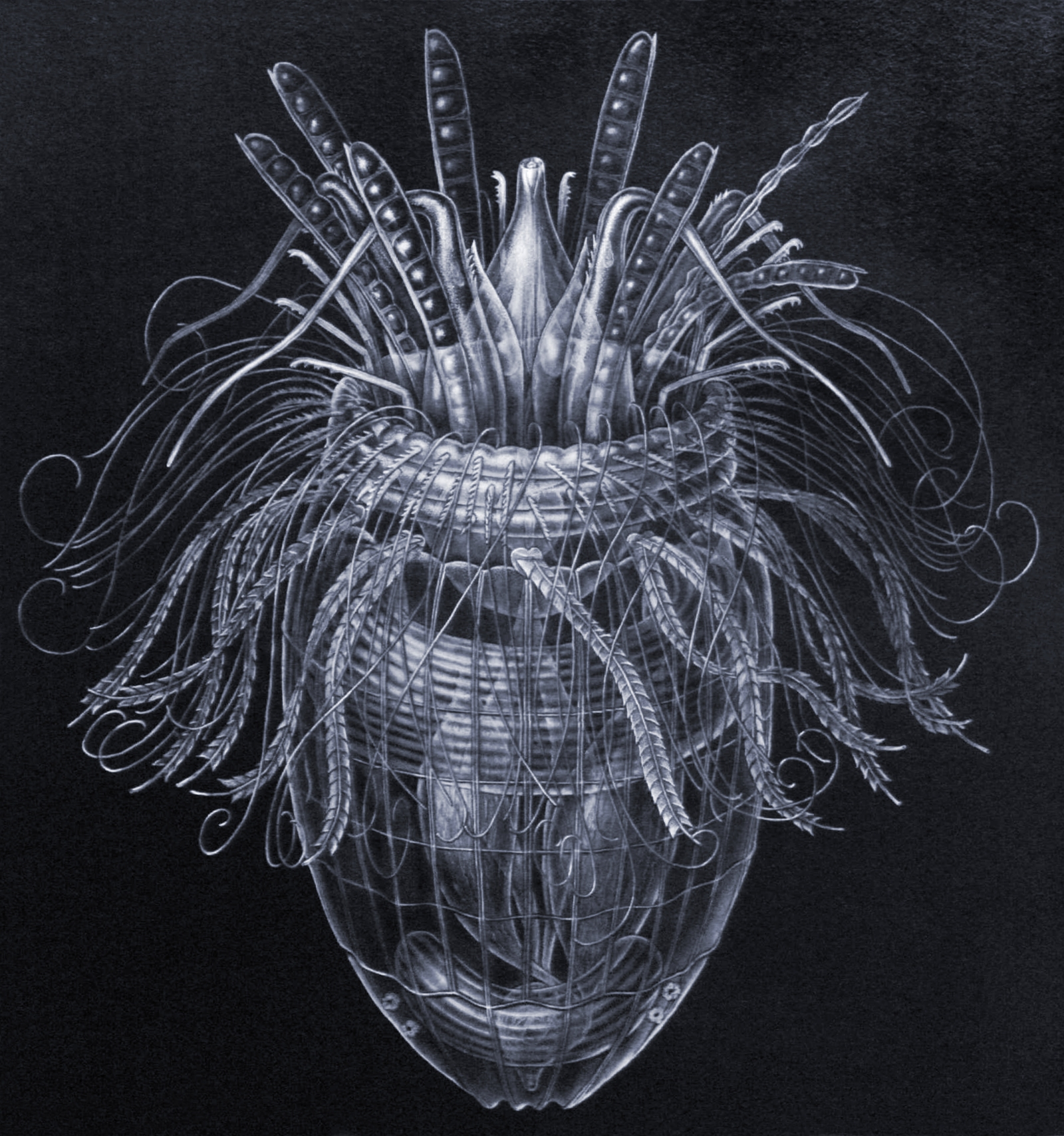
- Pliciloricus enigmaticus, illustration by Carolyn Bartlett Gast

Scientific classification
- Kingdom: Animalia
- Subkingdom: Eumetazoa
- Clade: ParaHoxozoa
- Clade: Bilateria
- Clade: Nephrozoa
- Clade: Protostomia
- Superphylum: Ecdysozoa
- Phylum: Loricifera; Kristensen, 1983

Families and genera
- Nanaloricida; Nanaloricidae; Pliciloricidae; Urnaloricidae; †Eolorica; Tenuiloricus; †Sirilorica (stem loriciferan)

= Loricifera =

Loricifera Temporal range: Middle Cambrian–Recent (total group)

Phylum of tiny marine invertebrates

Loricifera (from Latin, lorica, corselet (armour) + Latin fero, to carry or bear), also known as corset animals, is a phylum of very small to microscopic marine scalidophoran sediment-dwelling animals with 44 described species and approximately 100 more that have been collected and not yet described. Their sizes range from 100 μm to c. 1 mm.

They are characterized by a protective outer case known as a lorica and their habitat is in the spaces between marine gravel to which they attach themselves. The phylum was discovered in 1983 by R.M. Kristensen, near Roscoff, France. They are among the most recently discovered groups of animals. They attach themselves quite firmly to the substrate, which is why they remained undiscovered for so long. The first specimen was collected in the 1970s, and described in 1983. They are found at all depths, in different sediment types, and in all latitudes.

== Morphology ==
The animals have a head, mouth, and digestive system, as well as the lorica. The head (which contains the mouth and the brain), a trunk region surrounded by six plates that make up the 'lorica' or corselet and–in between these two–the neck region. Loricifera has a well developed brain and scalids are individually connected to the brain by nerves. The armor-like lorica consists of a protective external shell or case of encircling plicae. They do not have a circulatory system or endocrine system. Many of the larvae are acoelomate, with some adults being pseudocoelomate, and some remaining acoelomate. Development is generally direct, though there are Higgins-larvae, which have toes and two or three pairs of hair-like structures from the backs of their loricas. Most adults are gonochoric. Very complex and plastic life cycles of pliciloricids include also paedogenetic stages with different forms of parthenogenetic reproduction. Loricifera is mostly dioecious, meaning there are males and females. However, there are a few species known to be hermaphroditic, which means they contain both male and female reproductive organs. Fossils have been dated to the late Cambrian.

== Taxonomic affinity ==
Morphological studies have traditionally placed the phylum in the Vinctiplicata with the Priapulida; this plus the Kinorhyncha constitutes the taxon Scalidophora. The three phyla share four characteristics in common–chitinous cuticle, rings of scalids on the introvert, flosculi, and two rings of introvert retracts. The monophyly of Scalidophora has been questioned: a 2015 study by Yamasaki and co-authors based on 18S and 28S rRNA gene sequences found Loricifera instead to be closely related to Nematoida and Panarthropoda, while a 2019 study by Laumer and co-authors sampling genomes from all animal phyla provisionally recovered Loricifera as the sister group to Nematoda. However, a 2022 study by Howard and co-authors again recovered a monophyletic Scalidophora, but suggested that non-monophyly of Scalidophora should not be ruled out.

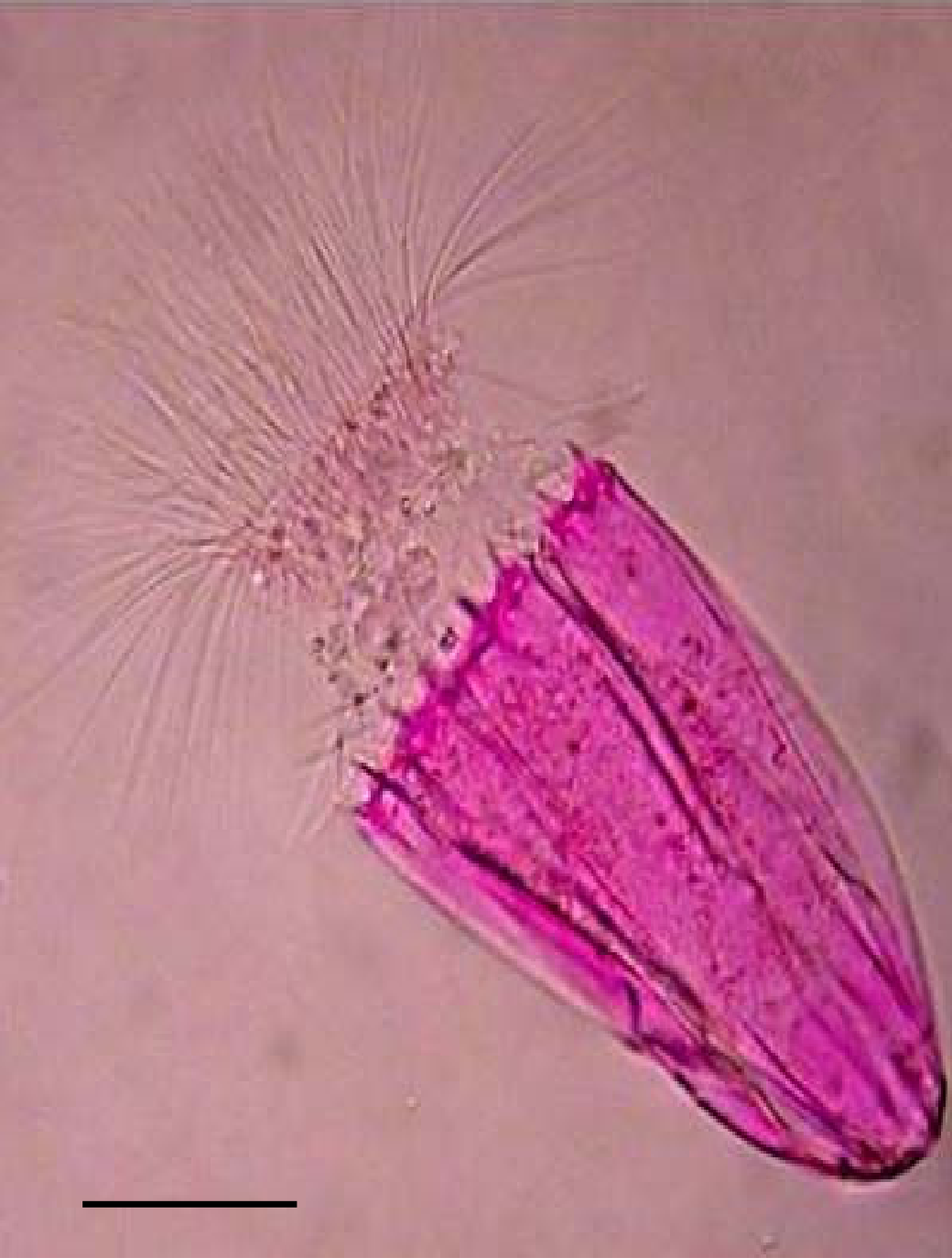
Light microscopy image of Spinoloricus cinziae adapted to an anoxic environment (stained with Rose Bengal). Scale bar is 50 μm.

== Evolutionary history ==
The loriciferans are believed to be miniaturized descendants of a larger organism, perhaps resembling the Cambrian fossil Sirilorica. However, the fossil record of the microscopic non-mineralized group is (perhaps unsurprisingly) scarce, so it is difficult to trace out the evolutionary history of the phylum in any detail.

The 2017 discovery of the Cambrian Eolorica deadwoodensis may shed some light on the group's history.

== In anoxic environments ==
Three species of Loricifera have been found in the oxygen-free sediments at the bottom of the L'Atalante basin in Mediterranean Sea, more than 3,000 meters down, the first multicellular organisms known to spend their entire lives in an anoxic environment. Initially, it was thought that they are able to do this because their mitochondria act like hydrogenosomes, allowing them to respire anaerobically. However, by 2021, questions arose as to whether or not they have mitochondria.

The newly reported animals complete their life cycle in the total absence of light and oxygen, and they are less than a millimetre in size. They were collected from a deep basin at the bottom of the Mediterranean Sea, where they inhabit a nearly salt-saturated brine that, because of its density (> 1.2 g/cm^{3}), does not mix with the waters above. As a consequence, this environment is completely anoxic and, due to the activity of sulfate reducers, contains sulphide at a concentration of 2.9 mM. Despite such harsh conditions, this anoxic and sulphidic environment is teeming with microbial life, including both chemosynthetic prokaryotes that are primary producers, and a broad diversity of eukaryotic heterotrophs at the next trophic level.

== Taxa ==
- Nanaloricidae Kristensen, 1983
  - Armorloricus Kristensen & Gad, 2004
  - Australoricus Heiner, Boesgaard & Kristensen, 2009
  - Culexiregiloricus Gad, 2009
  - Fafnirloricus Fujimoto, 2020
  - Nanaloricus Kristensen, 1983
  - Phoeniciloricus Gad, 2004
  - Scutiloricus Neves, Kristensen & Møbjerg, 2021
  - Spinoloricus Heiner, 2007
- Pliciloricidae Higgins & Kristensen, 1986
  - Pliciloricus Higgins & Kristensen 1986
  - Rugiloricus Higgins & Kristensen, 1986
  - Scaberiloricus Sørensen, Herranz, Neves, Kristensen & Garraffoni, 2023
  - Titaniloricus Gad, 2005
  - Wataloricus Fujimoto, Yamasaki, Kimura, Ohtsuka & Kristensen, 2020
- Urnaloricidae Heiner & Møbjerg Kristensen, 2009
  - Urnaloricus Heiner & Møbjerg Kristensen, 2009
- incertae sedis
  - Patuloricus Sørensen, Grzelak, Kristensen & Herranz, 2022
  - Tenuiloricus Neves & Kristensen, 2014
- Extinct taxa (unclassified)
  - †Eolorica Harvey & Butterfield, 2017
  - †Orstenoloricus Maas et al. 2009
  - †Sirilorica? Peel, 2010
